The following is a list of fictional characters from the comic series The Boys, created by Garth Ennis and Darick Robertson, and subsequent media franchise developed by Eric Kripke, consisting of a live-action adaptation, the web series Seven on 7, the animated anthology series The Boys Presents: Diabolical, and the upcoming live-action spin-off series Gen V.

Overview
 Key

Main cast

Recurring cast

The Boys
The Boys are a CIA black ops team, initially created by Col. Greg Mallory to observe, record and sometimes liquidate Supes created by the mega conglomerate Vought. Ostensibly assembled to help prevent / avenge the immoral and illegal actions of the largely out of control "supe" community, they also seek to ensure that Vought lacks the stability or the platform to push for use of superhumans in national defense. Over time the team's focus changed due to Butcher's increased inability from one of management / containment to the total elimination of all Supes. As Mallory notes in #55, 14 people were killed by the Boys from 1987 to 1995 and "nearly three times that number" between 1995 and 2002, when Butcher had gained more influence. This coincides with Mallory's belief in Issues #54–55 that in spite of the seductiveness of the concept of special forces teams, the application of them can often go wrong as they try to justify their budgets and create their private conflicts. As a result, Mallory feels that the original concept for the team has gone awry, and would never have created the unit as it currently stands.

The first iteration of the Boys was decommissioned after a disastrous confrontation with the Seven in 2001 that resulted in the deaths of Mallory's grandchildren. The unit was reformed a few years later – indicated in #1 to be soon after the 2004 Presidential election – and have carried on where they left off. Due to the fact that direct confrontation may be needed, all the members have enhanced strength and durability due to injections of Compound V, and all (with the exception of Hughie) show no restraint when on the attack – although they avoid killing when it complicates matters in most cases.

Though they are not as powerful as the corrupt superheroes they fight, they compensate with their blue-collar grit, their willingness to fight dirty, their access to high military grade weaponry and explosives, and their lack of fear to kill if they deem it necessary. Thanks to Butcher, Frenchman and Mother's Milk's military backgrounds, the Boys also gained elite military combat and weapons training to make them even deadlier than were before. They also became master hand-to-hand combat specialists thanks to Mother's Milk's background as a former boxer.

Billy Butcher

Hughie Campbell

Mother's Milk

The Frenchman
First seen in issue #2, The Frenchman is one of the original Boys, and displays a penchant for extreme violence within a few frames of his first appearance. As his name suggests, he is French. His spoken French uses incorrect phrasing, though whether this is an intentional plot point is not yet known. He takes an immediate liking to "Petit Hughie." He and the Female are the 'muscles' of the team, and he is prone to violent outbursts (especially with any insults towards France and the French), although he can control them better than the Female. According to Mother's Milk, however, it is better for the rest of humanity in general if they are in the team rather than in the outside world.

Like Billy and Mother's Milk, the Frenchman possesses military experience, particularly holding knowledge in ballistics, to the extent that Butcher defers to him on that matter. The Frenchman also possesses an incredibly strong sense of smell. When his sense of smell is first shown in the Glorious 5 Year Plan arc, a confused Hughie asks why Terror isn't sniffing around. To which Butcher replies "Frenchie has the better nose for it." Implying that The Frenchman's sense of smell is greater than that of a dog.

The Frenchman appears to be quite shy and caring until someone provokes him, to which he will attack or even kill in a gruesome manner, for example, battering three American businessmen in a coffee shop for calling him a "Goddamn surrender monkey" and a "fucking cheese-eater." In #55, Mallory notes that cruelty to children makes Frenchie "livid," which renders him hard to control when such scenarios are encountered.

In #37, his possible origin story is told, though it is also possible they are but delusions. Returning home from military service, he is welcomed by the residents of his native Franglais (who curiously refer to him as Frenchie), but soon learns that his lover has taken off with his childhood rival, Pierre. Renouncing violence, he refuses to confront Pierre. Months later, at a local festival that featured the sport of jousting on bicycles with baguettes while screaming exaggerated Maurice Chevalier impression laughter, his father challenged Pierre to restore the family's honor. Pierre, fearing certain defeat, topples the challenger's bicycle with a stale croissant, killing him. Renouncing his newfound pacifism, the Frenchman exacts his revenge on Pierre and starts drifting from place to place, until he gets into a bar fight with an American and is seen in action by Billy, who promptly recruits him (remarking that he needs "a mad fucking cunt"). In the issue, nobody is sure how true most of this is. What is known is that Butcher had a folder on the Frenchman's membership in the French Foreign Legion; that, along with his characteristically British usage of the words "mum" and "wanker" and his hometown's name literally meaning "French-English," would suggest a British origin. The only reference to the truth of the Frenchman's tale is his vow to remain with The Boys "until the bitter end."

He seems to have a fondness for the Female, bonding with her with playing games (like reverse-strip poker, paintball, scrabble, and snowball fights, which he always seems to lose) with her; this seems to have made progress, as he is the only one who can safely wake her. In #38, it was revealed he took on the task of 'humanizing' her, and was the first person to have actually treated her with kindness and civility. He also takes offense to when Butcher or Mallory refer to her as an it. In #16, he forced the New York Mafia to stop hiring the Female as a hitman. In an effort to stop the Female from killing for the mobs, he attempted to hold her back and was viewed as if she was about to attack; the Frenchman told her "I'd rather die than not be your friend, and if it has to be by your hand, so be it," to which the Female just sadly walked away.

In #63, he loses his right arm in battle. He survives due to Vought-American medical treatment. After the events in Washington, he appears to have taken to wearing a Napoleonic hat with his jacket.

In #69, while searching their HQ at the Flatiron Building, the Frenchman hears something odd, and finds a high-yield bomb (left by Butcher) with a few seconds left on the timer. Knowing there is no chance to escape, he turns and expresses his love for The Female "from the first." He and The Female are killed in the subsequent explosion.

In the television series, Tomer Kapon portrays The Frenchman / Frenchie. He suffered abuse from his bipolar father, who once attempted to smother him with a Hello Kitty duvet, kidnapped him while evading the police, and being forced to kneel in broken glass, all of which Frenchie attributes to a pathological need to follow, regardless of who they are.

The Female (of the Species)
 is one of the earliest members of the Boys and the only woman of the group. First appearance is issue #2. She is known for her animalistic brutality (which even visibly shocks, yet impresses Butcher), and suffers from selective mutism. When not working for the Boys, she used to do freelance work for the Mafia.

She is in the habit of "explosively eviscerating" her victims and it is implied in issue #3 that she may be triggered to do so merely by someone touching her, possibly as a result of past trauma (even Vas, one of the more powerful Soviet supers, made the mistake and lost two fingers). This does not appear to apply to the Frenchman. She is shown to have a tendency for ripping off people's faces. In issue #16, the Frenchman states that she 'does these things because [she] cannot not do them'. Issue #24 states that she has continued killing, despite The Frenchman forcing the mob to back off. Issue #38 shows that, as an infant, she found her way into a pail of discarded Compound V waste, slaughtering scientists in the building, and eventually getting captured, only to escape years later, when Butcher and the original team of Boys rescue her and Frenchie adopts her.

She is beaten into a coma by Stormfront in #31, but not before ripping out one of his eyes. She recovers in #34, much to Hughie's annoyance as she broke his arm when he reached for a bag of chocolate limes next to her bed. The Female also seems to be very fond of animals, as she freed Jamie the hamster out of his wrapping after he emerged from the Blarney Cock's anus and would subsequently take care of him during Hughie's hiatus from the team (resulting in him becoming morbidly obese), ostensibly as a deterrent to being subjected to the same treatment again. She had a particular bond with Terror, often shown tickling him or engaging of acts with play with him. She takes his death extremely hard, lying down next to Terror mournfully, after he is killed.

The Female occasionally shows signs of responding to the Frenchman's treatment with moments of genuine human reactions. She smiles when enjoying her favorite candy; she chooses to restrain her murderous urges rather than hurt the Frenchman; and she speaks for the first time in Issue #66, due to her amusement over Hughie stealing Doc Peculiar's file on Queen Maeve for the purpose of masturbating to the photos contained inside. She is shown to be laughing, and has even spoken for the first time with the word "Ha!"

During a meeting discussing how The Boys were going to stop Butcher, Hughie brings up the idea of including the Female, since she has not spoken for herself. The Frenchman disagrees, saying this would halt or even reverse her positive development and M.M. voices his opinion she deserves the opportunity to walk away more than anyone else. Hughie concurs, then tells the Female it is okay to stay behind. However, as the others start to walk out the door, she says to them "I hate mean people," the only time she has ever spoken a complete sentence. She then puts on her trench coat and walks with them. Hughie states that it is all four of them against Butcher.

In #69, she and The Frenchman are killed when Butcher bombs The Boys' headquarters, the Flatiron Building.

Karen Fukuhara portrays the Female in the live-action television series adaptation. At a young age, she and her brother Kenji were captured by a liberation army, who killed their parents, and experimented on them. In the process, she gained super-strength and a healing factor that allows her to heal from fatal injuries, though she stopped speaking and learned sign language along with her brother to communicate with each other. After Kenji's death, she teaches it to Frenchie. During season three, she loses her powers after being injured by Soldier Boy, though she later regains them through Compound V.

Lieutenant Colonel Mallory
The original team leader of the Boys,  only appeared in the comics via mention or as operating from the shadows, until he was formally introduced in issue #49.

An elderly man in his nineties (Compound V has slowed his aging),  was an Ivy League graduate and a captain in World War II when his platoon was chosen as the test run for "supes" in combat. Due to the idiocy of Soldier Boy, a Waffen-SS platoon finds the camp when they spot the Avenging Squad's flying members who Soldier Boy had sent on an unauthorized reconnaissance flight  (as part of the Battle of the Bulge) and Mallory was the only survivor, spending the rest of the war in a POW camp.

Issues #54 and #55 showed that he and his friend Rick Burnham joined the early CIA after the war, wanting to do something about Vought-American Consolidated and their superhumans – though everyone else in the group considered this bizarre. He spent years watching the company on his own initiative until he made contact with the Legend, who gave him the backstory on Compound V and Jonah Vogelbaum. Mallory set up Vogelbaum to be kidnapped by Vought's rival so he could kill the man, only to find himself unable to; instead, he brought him into the CIA – the scientist's knowledge causing Burnham, then-director, to recognize VA as a threat – and had him make V for them (while ensuring he'd deliberately make V expensive so the CIA couldn't create a superhuman program). Mallory was the first test subject for the new V.

Mallory had a team created to monitor, police, and liquidate "supes," but erred in hiring Butcher as his muscle; Butcher went on to hire the other members and slowly twist the team round to the way he wanted it. The two clashed on the issue of the Female, as he refused to simply treat her like a weapon as Butcher wanted (#38). Following the 9/11 attacks, he let himself be steered into blackmailing the Seven and this got his granddaughters murdered by the Lamplighter. Following the aftermath, the Lamplighter was given to Mallory to kill, as a peace gesture from the Seven; Butcher is left angry at him at the realization that the colonel never intended to let him kill Homelander. Afterward, Mallory went off to live in seclusion at Barbary Bay.

Following the Boys' reformation, Mallory was a background figure; it is revealed that Mother's Milk was secretly in contact with him. During the Highland Hughie miniseries, it is revealed that Mallory went undercover (pretending to be a sympathetic English gentlemen) to watch Hughie as a favor for Mother's Milk, and to secretly steer him into conflict with mobsters to test him. He reveals himself to Hughie by giving him a number to contact. #52–55 had Hughie visit him to get the backstory on the Boys and warnings about Butcher's nature; Hughie took this on board but accused Mallory of being a monster himself, one that wanted to justify all the blood he'd spilt and messes he made, and that Mallory's "old bastard war veteran" personality was an act. At the end of #55, Mallory's house is broken into by someone (implied to be Butcher) to kill him; Mallory's last words are, "So why don't you do me a favour and get it the Hell over with, mm?"

A female version of the character named  appears in the live-action television series adaptation, portrayed by Laila Robins while Sarah Swire portrays a younger version in flashbacks to 1984.

The Legend
First appearance is issue #7. The Legend, also called "Old Legend", is an as-yet-unnamed elderly man who, while not an official member of the Boys, works as their informant.

He is a former comic editor and writer who worked for Vought-American's Victory Comics subsidiary, writing all the comics based on Vought's superheroes to "give people supes like they wanted supes to be". His work on superhero comics gives him incredible knowledge of them and Vought-American. He hates "that comic-book crap", though he lives under a comic store surrounded by his work.

The Legend has no family other than his two sons, both of whom are deceased. His elder son was killed in Vietnam as a result of faulty rifles produced by Vought-American (which ironically resemble the British Army's SA80 bullpup rifles). His son's death is the impetus for his association with Vought: to gather information in the hope he could one day assist in their destruction. It is also revealed in issue #54 that once Vought-American introduced the Homelander to the world in 1971, the Legend made a strategic move and got himself filmed at a memorial service for the air cav that his first son served in. Greg Mallory did not buy the fact that a Vought-American man felt guilty about what his company was doing. His second son is revealed in issue #22 to be the Teenage Kix member Blarney Cock, from whom he was estranged and was satisfied that Hughie killed him. He was produced by The Legend and Queen Maeve during a relationship that the two had together, which was confirmed in issue #57 when Hughie discover surveillance photos and transcripts of The Legend having sex with Queen Maeve.

Unlike other heroes, the Legend has shown a certain fondness for Queen Maeve, serving as her confidant at times, and showing an almost fatherly approach during her encounter with the Boys after 9/11 and on Doc Peculiar's transcripts. Butcher has accused The Legend of developing feelings for Queen Maeve, which could set up dire consequences for both The Boys and The Seven. In issue #67, after informing Hughie of the death of Vas, he is confronted by Butcher and dies when Butcher kicks him violently in the anus. Which is implied by the fact that the comic on the floor in front of him is called "Shitfoot".

Paul Reiser portrays the Legend in the live-action television series adaptation. This version is the former Vice President of Hero Management at Vought before he was ousted prior to the series by Madelyn Stillwell and Stan Edgar. Additionally, the Legend sports a prosthetic leg as a result of an incident that Butcher caused and claims to have been previously involved with several celebrities.

The Seven
The Seven are the world's premier superhero team, created by Vought-American through injecting perfected Compound V into the fetuses of women who "wouldn't be missed", resulting in superheroes significantly more powerful than any others. The Seven's members care little about their advertised ideals and are more concerned about merchandising rights. They have shown grave incompetence in the face of the serious crises they are supposedly meant to solve; during the September 11 attacks, their efforts to land one of the hijacked planes resulted in the death of one member and the destruction of the Brooklyn Bridge, causing a significant public relations setback for both the team and VA.

To prevent mutually assured destruction, the team has a deal with the Boys that neither group will take action against the other, following an incident that saw Lamplighter kill Mallory's grandchildren and the Boys kill Lamplighter.

The Seven, as interpreted within the television series, are considered by some reviewers to be a parody analogous to DC's Justice League.

Darick Robertson acknowledged the parody, but made it clear that this is not the DC universe: "I didn't have any problem parodying them, because what I saw very clearly is how the Homelander isn't Superman, how Queen Maeve isn't Wonder Woman. What's really important to me is that anybody can put on a superhero costume, but that doesn't make you Superman."

The Homelander

Black Noir

Queen Maeve

Queen Maeve is a long-time member of the Seven; her powers include super-strength, flight, and invulnerability. It is suggested that Queen Maeve was more passionate about the Seven's mission than the other superheroes at one point, but found her spirit broken by the team's disastrous handling of the 9/11 attacks. It is also suggested that the 9/11 debacle is the source of her alcoholism.

She harbors a great hatred of the Homelander and the rest of the Seven, leading her to help the Boys in their surveillance efforts by planting cameras in the team's headquarters.

During the Homelander's attempted coup d'etat against the U.S. government, Starlight convinces Queen Maeve to leave the Seven with her. Homelander blocks them, intending to kill them for fun. Queen Maeve physically throws Starlight out of the Seven's headquarters and engages the Homelander in a futile battle. After her sword is revealed to be a metal prop, Queen Maeve is decapitated by the Homelander, who throws her head past Starlight during her escape.

In the live-action television adaptation, Dominique McElligott portrays Queen Maeve. She is named after the mythical Irish monarch Medb, and her representation within the series is considered by at least one reviewer of the series to be analogous to DC's Wonder Woman. This version's real name is Maggie Shaw, and is depicted as being bisexual. After joining the Seven, she was forced into a relationship with Homelander so the public believes the team are "perfect", though she eventually breaks up with him. She was also in a clandestine relationship with a woman named Elena, who broke up with Maeve as they were unable to go public due to Vought's micromanaging the Seven's lives. In season two, Maeve rekindles her relationship with Elena, but Homelander overhears a phone call between them and subsequently outs Maeve on live television. Following this, Maeve conspires with the Deep to obtain proof that Homelander deliberately abandoned a crashing airliner to cover for his mistake so she can blackmail him. When Elena finds out, she breaks up with Maeve. She then saves the Boys from Stormfront and blackmails Homelander into letting them live. Thereafter, she acts as an informant for Billy Butcher, providing him with V-24 - a variant of Compound V which grants superpowers for 24 hours - and information concerning a superweapon called "BCL-Red", which allegedly killed Soldier Boy, until she is captured by Homelander and Black Noir. When Homelander attempts to move her to avoid a search warrant, Maeve escapes and regroups with Annie and the Boys. However, Maeve disagrees with their initial plan to kill Homelander and leaves with Butcher and Soldier Boy to do so themselves. In the ensuing fight, Homelander gouges out Maeve's eye before she knocks Soldier Boy out of Vought Tower to stop him from killing the Boys with his powers, losing her own in the process. Following this, she goes into hiding to live with Elena, while the public (and Homelander) believes she had sacrificed herself.

McElligott additionally voices the comic book version of Maeve in The Boys Presents: Diabolical episode "I'm Your Pusher".

A-Train
A-Train is a superhero with super-speed whose carelessness was responsible for the accidental death of Wee Hughie's girlfriend in the first issue. A-Train was formerly a member of the Teenage Kix, but was promoted to the Seven as a replacement to Mister Marathon. He is the most juvenile and crudest member of the Seven, being the one who most openly enjoys humiliating Starlight. A heavy drug user and bitter over Starlight, A-Train openly expresses a desire to assault her again. One such attempt results in him being temporarily blinded in one eye. In Herogasm, he appears to be genuine friends with Jack from Jupiter, though this friendship ends during the events of "The Big Ride". His catchphrase is "Can't stop the A-Train--!"

In issue #61, he leaves The Seven's headquarters amid the imminent crisis saying "I am gonna check into the Mandarin, chill for a couple weeks." In #62-3, Butcher captures him and presents him to Wee Hughie with the intention of finally getting Hughie to kill him. Hughie has doubts, despite Butcher playing audio footage of A-Train and the Seven discussing Robin's death and laughing about it after being encouraged by his teammates to disregard the incident when he started to feel some small regret over it. As Hughie berates him for all the pain he caused him with Robin's death, A-Train begs for his life, crying that he doesn't want to die. Upon hearing the audio of the Seven's conversation of their decision to bring in Starlight and their intention to victimize her, Hughie finally murders A-Train by decapitating him with a kick to the head.

In the live-action television adaptation, Jessie T. Usher portrays A-Train. This version's real name is Reggie Franklin. As a member of the Seven, A-Train became addicted to Compound V out of desperation to maintain his status as the world's fastest man, notably during the "Race of the Century" against the similarly powered Shockwave. This leads to him accidentally killing Hughie's girlfriend Robin in the series premiere and later murdering his girlfriend Popclaw after learning the Boys blackmailed her. A-Train continues to abuse Compound V until he suffers a heart attack in the season one finale. In season two, he awakens from a coma, but is removed from the Seven due to his failing speed and replaced by Shockwave. Following this, the Deep recruits A-Train into the Church of the Collective, promising to help him rejoin the Seven. After learning that Stormfront is pressuring Edgar to reinstate the Deep into the Seven over him following Shockwave's death, A-Train obtains information on her Nazi past for Hughie and Annie, and is subsequently reinstated. In season three however, his excessive use of Compound V has left him unable to use his speed lest his heart gives out. In addition, he sports a new costume connected to his heritage despite not caring about it and kills Blue Hawk over the latter's use of excessive violence against several African-American individuals, including his brother Nathan, only to suffer heart failure and undergo a heart transplant from Blue Hawk. After Nathan, now permanently paralyzed, confronts A-Train over Blue Hawk's murder, he disowns him and orders him to leave his house, saying that he wanted justice rather than vengeance and claiming that A-Train only cares about himself.

The Deep
A long-time member of the Seven, The Deep is marketed by Vought-American as the "King of the Seas" and claims he cannot remove his helmet due to an Atlantean curse. The Deep is actually a black man in a diving suit. Despite his marketing as "King of the Seas", The Deep does not appear to have any aquatic based powers, instead possessing superhuman strength, durability,  and flight. The Deep is the most mature, civilized member of the team and often bears the brunt of other characters' contempt, disregard, and racism. Occasionally finding himself in embarrassing happenstance that steal his metaphorical thunder, such as arriving at the Boys' headquarters to confront them and Butcher slamming the door in his face after telling him to leave. Despite him being one of the more mature members of The Seven, he is not above lowering himself—as he, along with A-Train, Jack From Jupiter and Black Noir were intending to sexually assault Starlight. He is the only remaining "lab grown" (original) member of the Seven after the events in Washington after he declined to take part in Homelander's attempted coup d'etat against the U.S. government. He is seen in Issue #72, as a part of a new team of superheroes that American Consolidated is attempting to create, called 'True'. The Vought Guy identifies him immediately, as his new costume, which includes a large, cone-shaped hood resembling a Klan hood still incorporates his helmet's porthole.

In the television adaptation, Chace Crawford plays The Deep. This version's real name is Kevin Moskowitz, is white, and has actual fish-like traits that he is insecure about. When Starlight joins the Seven, the Deep pressures her to perform oral sex on him. When she can no longer keep her peace and discloses the incident to a live audience at a televised religious event, Vought forces him to publicly apologize for the sexual misconduct they covered up for him over the years and reassign him to Sandusky, Ohio, where he is raped by a fangirl via his gills. The following year, Church of the Collective members Eagle the Archer and Carol manipulate him into taking a hallucinogenic substance which causes him to believe that his gills (voiced by Patton Oswalt) are confronting him about the root of his sexual malfeasance, rooted in his ability to hear the suffering of all sentient ocean life as they are eaten by humans since a child, and the death of a dolphin he had been romantically involved with. Following this incident and his arranged marriage to Cassandra Schwartz, the Deep joins the Church of the Collective and convinces A-Train to do so as well. He also assists Maeve in securing proof that Homelander abandoned a crashing airliner in return for her vouching for his return to the Seven. However, his return is denied, and the Deep leaves the Church. A further year later, after the Deep manages to rebuild his reputation by writing an exposé about the Church, Homelander personally has him rejoin the Seven in order to spite Starlight after she is made co-captain of the Seven. Additionally, the Deep becomes the new head of Vought's Crime Analytics division and fires all but Anika for posting negative comments about Vought on social media. After the Deep engages in a sexual relationship with Ambrosias, an octopus he encountered at Herogasm, Cassandra leaves him after he suggests a threesome. Homelander later sends the Deep to kill Lamar Bishop so Victoria Neuman can become Robert Singer's presidential campaign running mate.

Crawford also voices The Deep in The Boys: Diabolical episode "BFFs".

Jack from Jupiter
Jack from Jupiter is a member of the Seven. A supposed extraterrestrial, his powers are flight and the ability to make himself invulnerable by speaking a secret word. A heavy drug user (going so far to inject himself with drugs cut with Queen Maeve's vaginal mucus), he is inclined to let things run their course in the Seven. Jack gets along quite well with A-Train, going so far as to take the junior member under his wing during Herogasm.

At times, Jack seems to act as the sole voice of reason in the group. In #49, he attempts to calm both Lamplighter during a meeting with the Boys and the Homelander shortly thereafter, when Lamplighter temporarily blinds the others and departs to trail Mallory; in #20, he tried to stop A-Train, who was angry about Starlight injuring him while repelling his rape attempt, from irritating the Homelander with complaints following a disastrous encounter with the Boys. Jack was highly critical of A-Train's attempt to rape her. This was not so much from any moral concerns, but rather from a prediction that she will be ejected from the Seven within a year in any case, darkly hinting that A-Train can do whatever he wants with her after that. Like The Deep, Jack is also irritated by his lower royalties compared to "the Big Three."

He is capable of flight, and is usually seen transporting non-flying members of the Seven during their official functions. His main power is his ability to generate a red-toned forcefield around his body for a limited time by uttering a secret word, which is eventually revealed to be "Carpo". It is said that Jack is virtually indestructible while his forcefield is active, with Butcher claiming that "you couldn't get an anti-tank round through his skin", once his word is said. The duration of his forcefield is unknown. Outside of this power, Jack is one of the weakest members of the Seven, due to his strength and durability being no different from an ordinary person.

During the September 11 attacks, Jack fled the scene with Mister Marathon upon realizing that Homelander's plan of action would worsen the situation. Jack's abrupt action led Black Noir, the Lamplighter, and the Deep to be injured, thus removing over half the Seven from the unfolding attacks within seconds. Jack flew back long enough to allow Mister Marathon to board a hijacked plane with Homelander and Queen Maeve before fleeing again.

Jack was dismissed from the Seven when Ms. Bradley of Vought-American publicly revealed that he had frequent relations with transsexual prostitutes, in an attempt to escalate hostilities between The Boys and The Seven. The revelation severely damaged his reputation and ostracized him from both the team and VA. Shortly afterwards, the Boys discovered Terror dead in their office. At Doc Peculiar's, Billy Butcher confronted Jack on the assumption that he had killed Terror. Jack attempted to use his invulnerability power, but was brutally murdered by Billy with a butcher knife while Butcher repeatedly asked him why he killed Terror.

Jack from Jupiter makes a minor appearance in The Boys Presents: Diabolical episode "I'm Your Pusher", voiced by Kevin Michael Richardson.

The Lamplighter
A former member of the Seven, the Lamplighter was turned over by the Seven to the Boys, after the murders of Mallory's granddaughters, in order to end their initial conflict. He is reanimated after his death and is hidden from view deep under the Seven's headquarters; he constantly soils himself, and the Seven take turns cleaning out his cell. His public story states that he took a hiatus from the team, with him being broadcast on national television after his reanimation with the rest of his team. He was then kept in the storage space he now "lives" in, the Homelander having him there as an "example" to the rest of the team for what happens to those who underestimate "The Boys." He is replaced by Starlight.

Lamplighter's powers seem to mostly emanate from his torch-like device, which he can use to fly and emanate blinding light or destructive fires. He has greatly enhanced physical endurance, having survived being struck by the wing of a plane in mid-flight, although the collision's force did cave in his ribs and nearly punctured his lungs; after the incident, he required multiple medications to relieve the pain.

In issue #66, it is revealed in a conversation with the Vought Guy that the Lamplighter was found by the CIA after a search warrant was exercised on the Seven's former headquarters.

Lamplighter appears in season two of the television adaption, portrayed by Shawn Ashmore. This incarnation's powers are pyrokinetic in nature, though he requires a source of fire. In the pilot episode, it is stated that he had retired from the Seven. In reality, Vought assigned him to work in the Sage Grove psychiatric hospital, which they were using as an underground testing site for Compound V, so he could prevent leaks. When Frenchie, Mother's Milk, and Kimiko infiltrate the facility in an attempt to discover Stormfront's connection to it, they encounter Lamplighter and accidentally cause a riot in their ensuing fight. The Boys save Lamplighter, who in turn keeps Stormfront from discovering them when she arrives later. He also confesses to accidentally killing Colonel Mallory's grandchildren eight years prior in an attempt to stop her from blackmailing him and resented Frenchie for not stopping him as Frenchie was assigned to tail him. Lamplighter allows the Boys to take him hostage and spirit him out of the facility. When Colonel Mallory arrives, he encourages her to kill him, but Frenchie persuades her not to. Later on, Lamplighter testifies against Vought in Supreme Court. While watching porn with Hughie, they learn that Annie was captured by Vought and go to rescue her, but Lamplighter immolates himself while they are inside the building. Nevertheless, his suicide helps Annie escape from her Supe-proof cell.

Starlight

Stormfront

Stormfront is the most powerful member of Payback. His name and fictionalized backstory portrays him as a reincarnated Viking. His name also references the well known Neo-Nazi website of the same name. In reality, Stormfront originally came to the United States from Nazi Germany in 1938 with Jonah Vogelbaum as the only product of the Third Reich's V-Program. He was given a very powerful and unique version of Compound V as a member of the Hitler Youth. Vogelbaum saw Stormfront as a danger due to his deep belief in Nazi ideology, and recommended that Vought-American destroy him. Instead, VA used genetic material taken from Stormfront as the basis for the experiments that would create the Homelander and Black Noir.

Stormfront was shown to be an unrepentant racist and an enthusiastic supporter of Nazism. It was revealed that Stormfront destroyed the levees and caused widespread flooding in New Orleans during Hurricane Katrina, aiming to ethnically cleanse the city and to free up valuable real estate for VA. He treated his teammates in Payback with contempt, especially Soldier Boy. After slaughtering several Mafioso he sneered, "Italians. What the Fuhrer was thinking, I'll never know." He also referred to the Female as a "Mongrel" and "Untermensch" (subhuman).

Stormfront was one of the most powerful superhumans next to the Homelander and Black Noir. He possessed superhuman strength, durability, flight, and the ability to exhale what appeared to be lightning bolts from his mouth. This "lightning" was powerful enough to burn humans alive and blow up the Boys' van. He also aged much more slowly than a normal human; in his 70s, he retained the appearance and vitality of a man half his age. He was far stronger than any of the individual members of the Boys, and able to easily overpower them. The Female, Mother's Milk and Billy Butcher were able to injure him during single combat, but it took the combined efforts of Butcher, Frenchie, Mother's Milk and Vas (each vocalizing the efforts of the British, Free French, American and Soviet forces during World War II) to put him down, kicking and curb-stomping him to death.

A female interpretation of the character appears in the second season of the live-action television series adaptation, portrayed by Aya Cash. This version's real name is Klara Risinger who, despite her youthful looks and command of social media, was born in 1919. Additionally, she was Frederick Vought's first successful test subject for Compound V, supported Nazi Germany, and married Frederick before they moved to the United States to continue his work, where they gave birth to a daughter. In the 1970s, Risinger operated as the superhero Liberty before fading into obscurity after committing a racially-charged murder. In the present, following her daughter's death from old age, she resurfaces as Stormfront, joins the Seven, and enters a sexual relationship with Homelander following a difficult beginning. After Starlight and Hughie discover her origins from A-Train and leak it to the public, Stormfront attempts to take Homelander's son Ryan, only to lose an eye to the boy's mother Becca and her limbs to Ryan himself before being incarcerated in an undisclosed location. A year later, she has continued her relationship with Homelander from her hospital bed until she realizes his goals do not align with hers and her dreams will go unfulfilled. On Homelander's birthday, she commits suicide, which contributes to his deteriorating mental state.

Minor members
 Mister Marathon: A former member of the Seven. He was removed from the 9/11 crisis by Jack from Jupiter (who happened to be carrying him), but apparently insisted that Jack return to leave him there so he could help. When it seemed Homelander would abandon the rescue attempt, Marathon insisted that he continue (albeit by pointing out that Vought-American would surely fire them if they gave up, rather than by appealing to any moral sense). While carrying Marathon, Homelander tried to intercept the plane but instead crashed through and broke it in half, in the process killing Marathon.
 Translucent: A member of the Seven exclusive to the television series, portrayed by Alex Hassell. He possesses the ability to turn his skin into a carbon meta-material that bends light, granting him superhuman durability and invisibility. Unbeknownst to the public, he is a pervert who uses his powers to spy on women. After being captured by the Boys, Butcher and Frenchie interrogate him for information on A-Train, during which they deduce that his skin does not protect him from internal trauma and insert C-4 explosives into his rectum. Hughie later detonates them, killing Translucent. His remains are later found by Homelander, who in season two, holds a funeral for him, claiming that he died taking on El Diablo's cartel.

Recurring characters

United States government
The Legend has stated that every United States government since Gerald Ford's administration (along with two-thirds of Congress) have been owned to some extent by the military-industrial complex, who are desperate to keep Vought-American's superhumans out of national defense contracts for fear of being unable to compete. This makes the government extremely willing to back the Boys, and the team was originally authorized under President Bush and continued under President Clinton.

Ever since the 9/11 attacks, the government has been in a state of internal conflict, with the President watching for any treacherous move by the vice-president and both of them trying to have their agents on each other's security details.

In contrast to the real world, the events of 9/11 saw the World Trade Center saved but the Brooklyn Bridge destroyed and America invaded Pakistan in response, with Afghanistan being severely hit by "collateral damage" (deliberately). The public is unaware that the Bridge wasn't the intended target of Al Qaeda. #51 reveals that America is, officially, assisting the Pakistani government – and secretly "pay[ing] them to let us invade", both with money and by deliberately removing "undesirables" (claiming they're enemy combatants) and taking them to a prison camp in Anchorage, Alaska. Special forces are heavily used in Pakistan (and causing civilian deaths) and a large number of soldiers have been crippled by IEDs.

Real-life political figures have also been included in the comic: Senator Prescott Bush is a Vought-American man in 1944, but unlike in real life he ends up killed by a German attack in the Battle of the Bulge (#52-3); Bobby Kennedy spearheaded an investigation into VA after the disastrous Ia Drang massacre in Vietnam; VA felt the first President Bush would be their man in government, but Mallory states in Butcher, Baker #6 that Bush was actually lying and planned to keep them at arm's length; Bush and Clinton both oversaw The Boys; and in #62, Butcher advises Rayner talks to Speaker of the House Nancy Pelosi in the event he assassinates Newman, and in #66 Pelosi is the Acting-President until after the 2008 election.

Kessler
Kessler is a CIA analyst whom Butcher uses to acquire information: he is referred to by the Boys (primarily Billy) as "Monkey". The origin of the nickname is revealed that, upon escorting Butcher to Doc Peculiar's house of prostitution, he was promptly raped by green monkeys in both ears. Upon his return to the whorehouse, Butcher discovers, with some amusement, that Peculiar had immortalized the event in the form of a statue of Kessler and the monkeys in the act.

Kessler has a fetish for female paraplegics and an inability to have an erection unassisted; he claims this is the result of the numerous times Butcher has kneed him in the groin when prompting him for information or punishing him.

Upon the news that Raynor intends to seek public office, she names Kessler to be her successor as the Director of the CIA. He attempted to use this knowledge as a way of making life difficult for the Boys, but he lost his composure during a fundraiser dinner upon seeing a paraplegic former athlete in #51; he took her up to a private room under false pretenses and attempted to sexually assault her with a dildo. She knocked him cold and was about to report him when Butcher stepped in. Kessler awoke to find himself bound spread-eagled on his belly on the bed with a dildo in his anus, as Butcher regaled him with the story he told to keep the athlete from reporting him, then blackmailed him into backing down from his harassment. He subsequently had Terror anally rape him to further humiliate him.

Susan L. Rayner
Susan L. Rayner is the director of the CIA. During the 1980s, she was a field officer in Afghanistan. She despises Butcher and vice versa, though is sexually involved with him. She's done many immoral things but considers they were for the greater good.

She attempted to use Silver Kincaid as a mole within the G-Men, but withheld this information from the Boys when sending them in to investigate the team. Butcher threatened to kill her and her family if she ever put the team in danger like that again but later claimed this was an empty threat – as he was manipulating her in this second encounter, that may have been a lie.

She decided to get out and quit the CIA to run for the US Senate, leaving Kessler as her replacement to get back at Butcher. In #51, Butcher met with her to give her information that could allow guided missiles to track supes, telling her to pass this on to the Air Force.

In #62, following the death of Dakota Bob, Rayner finds herself frozen out of the new government by Vic's Vought-American "attack bitch": the CIA is de facto neutralized and she's informed that she'll likely lose her job. She warns Butcher and also tells him she gave his file to NORAD; she also admits to feeling frightened, "the ground disappeared beneath my feet", by the fact she finds herself colluding with the Joint Chiefs to commit high treason, and is terrified when Butcher implies he may assassinate Vic.

After #66, she has moved on from the CIA but has instructed Kessler to disband the Boys. She did not approve Kessler's nomination to become the full-time CIA director. Kessler would have his revenge, as later during a political rally, he embarrassed Rayner using audio taken from one of her many sexual encounters with Butcher, as well as chartering a small plane with the banner "Rayner is a whore" conducting a fly by.

Jennifer Esposito portrays the character in the television series, with her surname spelled Raynor. In a departure from the comics, Raynor is assassinated by Congresswoman Victoria K. "Vic" Neuman during the second season after the former deduced the latter's plans for a "coup".

President Robert "Dakota Bob" Shaefer
Robert "" Shaefer is the Republican President of the United States, Shaefer is responsible for signing off on an order for the CIA to monitor all superheroes – an order that ultimately results in the reformation of the Boys. He has a hatred of superheroes due to the threat they pose to the world. Issue #20 states he is a former Halliburton executive, and "cold and hard as the Badlands themselves". Shaefer and Vic the Veep highlight that The Boys isn't about good versus evil so much as competence versus incompetence. Ennis said the character "was supposed to be the smart neocon – the guy who would quite happily sell off every public service he could, but who believed in very strong national security. Who would start a war, but the right war – going for the real home of the insurgency (this would of course create all manner of new problems, but that would be his starting point)."

Shaefer was the Vice President under George H. W. Bush after a scandal took out the previous choice (implied to be Dan Quayle). He ran for office after Bill Clinton. Despite his loathing of "Vic the Veep", he was forced by the Republican Party to take him as vice president.

He is said in Herogasm to have ordered the invasion of Pakistan instead of Afghanistan (which the CIA had asked for) after 9/11, and gave many private defense and reconstruction contracts to Halliburton and other companies, as well as having "sold off" most of the federal government. #51 reveals he has done highly immoral things to get the US into Pakistan. Mallory says in #55, as does VA in Herogasm, that he is in the pocket of multiple corporate interests. He is unpopular by the time of the series for his policies and war record, but appears respected by Butcher because of his ironclad willingness to stick to his principles.

Dakota Bob almost averts the bulk of the 9/11 attacks on the World Trade Center and the Pentagon by paying attention to intelligence warnings, putting NORAD on high alert and response teams at US airports, and having two of the hijacked planes immediately shot down and the third boarded at the airport. The fourth gets through after Vic incapacitates Shaefer and takes control, ordering NORAD to stand down, with the intent of allowing the Seven to intercept the fourth plane. This plan backfires disastrously; the Seven have no plan and no training (a result of VA withholding police and emergency training to avoid antagonizing normal police/fire/rescue organizations) and they cause the plane to crash into the Brooklyn Bridge instead. Shaefer is unable to prove that Vought-American are up to something, but keeps a close watch on Vought infiltration of the Secret Service; officially, the fourth plane was also shot down but too late.

Despite all of the scheming and counter-scheming between the White House and Vought-American, Dakota Bob is killed in issue #60 by an angry wolverine. The Vought Guy, while acknowledging that the turn of events is for the best, is left irritated and slightly disappointed that an expensive, and intricately planned paramilitary operation was pre-empted in such a way.

In the live-action television series adaptation, Jim Beaver portrays U.S. Secretary of Defense and Democrat Robert "Dakota Bob" Singer, with his surname changed to be a deliberate reference to Beaver's character Bobby Singer from The CW television series Supernatural. In the third season, Singer campaigns to become President with Victoria Neuman as his running mate following the assassination of her predecessor Lamar Bishop.

Victor K. "Vic the Veep" Neuman
"" is the neoconservative Vice President of the United States under "Dakota Bob" Shaefer. It has been implied that he is mentally handicapped, and that his family are all Vought-American people; he himself was said in #6 to have been a former CEO for Vought-American. He appears to be only clever enough to be politically useful, learning his speeches phonetically and unable to perform everyday tasks without assistance. He is commonly recognized by his large underbite and his constant blank facial expression. Ennis has said "Vic the Veep was meant to be the most grotesque parody of Bush, Jr. imaginable".

Vic and his backers are suspected of trying to ensure the President would be in Florida during 9/11, leaving Vic in charge and able to have the Seven liberate the hijacked planes; when this failed, Dakota Bob is knocked unconscious with a fire extinguisher, he then orders the USAF to leave the last hijacked plane, leading to the destruction of the Brooklyn Bridge when the Seven failed. Nobody saw the assault, but Vic's Secret Service detail are suspected, having been infiltrated by Red River. Vought intends to assassinate the President as, knowing Vic would never win in an election, this is the only way for Vic to become president and thus bring in superhuman defense contracts. The President takes great care in selecting Vic's security detail, ensuring as few Red River agents are on it as possible.

Thanks to Dakota Bob's accidental death after Vic released a wolverine (thinking it was his dog), Vic becomes President in #60. His Secret Service detail is replaced with Red River operatives and a Vought-American executive directs him in making policies, such as the de facto shutdown of all CIA operations and the makeup of his new Cabinet. Butcher openly refers to assassinating him in #62, but this is preempted when Homelander convinces most of the superheroes to launch a coup that they think is in the name of Vic and VA. Vic is murdered prior to issue #65 by Homelander, who has decapitated him.

A female version of the character named Victoria K. "Vic" Neuman is introduced in the second season of the live-action television series adaptation, portrayed by Claudia Doumit while Elisa Paszt portrays her in flashbacks. This version is initially described as a "young wunderkind congresswoman" inspired by Alexandria Ocasio-Cortez. Publicly, she is a smart, charismatic, dedicated politician apparently looking to bring accountability against Vought. However, she is secretly a telekinetic Supe working as an assassin to pave the way for her presidential campaign. In season three, she establishes the Federal Bureau of Superhuman Affairs and works closely with Hughie Campbell to control opposition and minimize damage to Vought by allowing the arrests of lower-tier Supes for comparatively minor offenses. After being confronted by a man named Tony, who refers to her as Nadia, she kills him with her powers, unaware that Hughie followed them and witnessed the act. Hughie later traces the origins of "Vicky" to the Red River adoption facility for children with superhuman abilities, and learns that she is Stan Edgar's secret adopted daughter. She then betrays Edgar and launches an investigation against him, forcing him to step down from Vought, in exchange for Compound V from Homelander to give her daughter, then forming an alliance with Homelander and giving him Ryan’s address, in exchange for killing Robert Singer's running mate Lamar Bishop to insert herself as Vice President.

Vought-American
Formerly Vought American Consolidated (V.A.C.), Vought-American is the series' main antagonist. It is a large defense contractor which owns the Seven, several smaller superhero teams, and their related franchises, and a fictionalised parody of the real-life Vought aircraft company, imagining an alternate history to reality in which they had pivoted to focus on developing superheroes.

Since World War II, Vought-American has sought to incorporate superheroes into national defense. Its first product for the military was a fighter plane that was rushed into production to replace the P-51 Mustang; it was discovered that a fatal design flaw killed more Allied pilots than it did the enemy. Although the use of the atom bomb removed the need for the plane, it revealed a tendency by Vought-American to release flawed products; its next major product was an assault rifle, but due to cutting costs on the manufacturing, the rifles resulted in a massacre in Vietnam when they failed to protect the soldiers they were issued to (they proved to be more useful as posts to mount their heads).

With the debut of the Seven and the subsequent monopoly of superhumans, VA is in a position to upend the traditional military-industrial complex making heroes into super-powered soldiers. Their current agreement with the American government is arranged so heroes will not possess any actual police powers or interfere with any government service. As a result, heroes are not given any police or rescue training, so they will not be seen as competition. This has created a number of problems from the beginning: heroes sent to support World War II troops are given no military training and cause the deaths of themselves and the soldiers they were sent to help when they inadvertently lead the enemy to the camp; heroes are unable to provide much help in an actual emergency and are relegated to minor support work that looks good on camera. The worst example is during 9/11. The Seven try to stop the terrorists on a passenger plane, but do not understand the tactical or physical challenges involved in entering a plane during flight. They end up sending the fractured plane into the Brooklyn Bridge.

Unable to get the contracts by semi-legal means, they've attempted the overthrow of the Russian government with a force of supervillains; manipulating reaction to 9/11; and intend to assassinate the President of the United States.

VA controls both Victory Comics, which whitewashes the exploits of the real-life superheroes; and Red River, a private military company with covert agents in the Secret Service. At the meeting between the Boys and the Seven, Red River operatives used nerve gas on a Delta Force squad that had been assigned as backup. This allowed a naked Homelander to enter the scene and massacre the soldiers. The Boys later came across the grisly scene.

After the superhuman attack on Washington, Vought-American is the subject of a congressional hearing, and has rebranded itself as American Consolidated in the correct belief that people will get distracted and forget who they are when the dust settles. The revelations of Compound V's ineffectiveness and the true nature (and eventual genocide) of the so-called 'heroes' the company was so proud of have effectively crippled Vought American/American Consolidated, leaving them with one last failed product as the Vought Guy finally breaks under the pressure.

In the live-action television series, Vought-American was founded by German scientist and first CEO, Frederick Vought, who created Compound V for the Nazis before defecting to the Allies. Sometime after the Cold War, Vought was rebranded as Vought International. Additionally, Vought International is described as primarily being a pharmaceutical company and defense contractor as opposed to a "superhero company" as Homelander had believed, with significant film, television, and music production branches, streaming services, non-profit organizations, food chains, and the Voughtland amusement park franchise all serving to market the Seven, among other superhero teams.

Vought Guy
The Guy From Vought, also known as Mr. Vought-America(n) or simply the Vought Guy, is Vought-American's major presence in the series, regularly sitting in on the Seven's meetings. His name, while first mentioned in #29, is not confirmed until #63. He is the most prominent normal human antagonist, orchestrating the near-coup of the Russian government, ordering and overseeing the massacre of the G-Teams, ordering Payback to ambush the Boys, and involved in the planned takeover of the White House.

The Vought Guy is a high-functioning sociopath and is practically the embodiment of VA, aiming to make a profit at the expense of others, suffering no remorse for any action. He is highly methodical and considers nothing is unimportant during planning. He also freely admits in #40 that Vought-American are gambling that Homelander will be controllable until they've won, and if he's not they can only "try not to be there at the time". Two major developments occur by sheer accident: the death of VA's CEO by a heart attack in #34, and the President being killed by a rabid animal in #60. When the latter happens, the Vought Guy said he felt "cheated".

Herogasm #4 mentions he had come up under Vought's recently deceased CEO Mr. Edgar, and #29 has Vought minutes from 1989 mentioning Stillwell as a "keen" young man working in then-executive Edgar's office.

His calm exterior is in contrast to the superhero teams he oversees: he never shows any concern in the Seven's meetings or around the Homelander, despite their powers, nor around Russian mob boss Little Nina. He is also utterly ruthless: after ordering the slaughter of every member of the G-Men to prevent the truth of Godolkin's activities getting out (which he'd previously covered up), he then arranges for Pre-Wiz, the children Godolkin was training and sexually abusing, to be kidnapped, locked into a large crate and finally dropped from an aircraft over the sea. Each of these acts are carried out by different groups of Red River operatives, as he thought that even Red River personnel might find the outright murder of children to be too much. Jack from Jupiter considers the Vought Guy to be worse than the Seven, and has said he used to have nightmares about the sort of things the executive might have had done; Homelander has shown signs of wanting to kill him, but always stops himself and seemed genuinely scared of him (or the true power he wields) in Herogasm #5.

In #34, the CEO of Vought-American (Mr. Edgar) dies, and it seemed possible that the Vought Guy would take his place. Instead, by #39, the Vought Guy allows another generic executive to become CEO, acting as a puppet in order to maintain his independence and influence affairs behind the scenes, indicating that he has been the true head of Vought for years. The Vought Guy also takes on Jess Bradley as a protégé and confidant. By #61, he seems to have an unguarded moment and admits he feels he can relax around her.

During Homelander's attempted coup d'etat against the United States government, the Vought Guy becomes aware that the superhero had tricked the Boys and VA into a conflict. The Vought Guy offers medical care to a wounded Frenchman and tries to make a deal with Billy Butcher, finally formally introducing himself as "James Stillwell" and asking the Boys to take a backseat role while they tried to clean up their "own shit"; Butcher refuses. After watching the events of Butcher's informational leak onto the World Wide Web, he is confronted by Homelander, who wishes to kill him. The Vought Guy keeps calm in front of the insane superhuman, to the point that Homelander declares he may have finally met a real superhuman. The Vought Guy states he was never impressed by Homelander, and regards Homelander's actions and use of his abilities to be unoriginal and unimpressive. After expressing a wish to commit suicide to spare himself Homelander's histrionics, Homelander tells him to keep watching and leaves.

In #66, he believes the company can survive the superhuman attack on Washington as they were genuinely uninvolved, growing superhumans as weapons "is disturbing but not yet illegal", and most of the other revelations about them can be shrugged off; he cites WikiLeaks, saying the general public reaction to such things is to say "the world works the way I always suspected". However, he knows they could not survive the revelation that they had tried to kill the President. When the Boys release everything they have on VA and the superheroes, the Vought Guy uses Jess Bradley as a scapegoat; his plan all along was to blame everything on her.

He meets with Hughie, who reveals the existence of the V-bombs and threatens to use them if VA approaches any country in the world about weaponizing superheroes. The Vought Guy meets with his subordinates before seeing the newest superhero team, wearing all-white costumes (some with white-pointed hoods) and going by the name of TRUE. The Vought Guy seems to realize that Compound V cannot supersede human nature (he notes the erection of one member of the new team, the telltale signs of drug withdrawal in another), laments that Compound V is a "bad product" and appears to start suffering a nervous breakdown in the final issue.

The Vought Guy is last seen in the epilogue series, Dear Becky, wandering around a pineapple plantation, quoting Milton Friedman and repeatedly muttering about good products and bad products, having lost his mind.

The Vought Guy was adapted as two separate characters in the live-action television series adaptation:

 The first adaptation, a female version of the character named Madelyn Stillwell appears in the first season in a main capacity, portrayed by Elisabeth Shue. In the series, Madelyn is shown to be a single mother to her infant son Teddy, the Senior Vice President of Hero Management at Vought, and in a relationship with Homelander. By the season one finale, Madelyn is murdered by Homelander for keeping secrets from him, with Butcher being accused due to his use of an explosive device in a failed attempt to kill Homelander. As of season two, Ashley Barrett goes on to replace Madelyn while Teddy survived, having developed the power to teleport, after he was found seventeen miles away from the blast site. In season three, Teddy has become a toddler and taken in by the Vought-controlled Red River orphanage. In a prequel episode depicted in The Boys Presents: Diabolical, Madelyn is revealed to have been sexually manipulating Homelander since he was a teenager.
 The second adaptation, a more comic-book-accurate (albeit black) version of the character named Stanford "Stan" Edgar (after , the unseen CEO of Vought-American later mentioned to have died of a heart attack in issue #34 of the comic series), is primarily portrayed by Giancarlo Esposito in a guest role in the first season finale and a recurring role in the second and third seasons, while Justiin Davis portrays him in flashbacks to 1984 in the third season. Originally intending to have Madelyn Stillwell succeed him, after learning of her death, he rehires Ashley Barrett to take her place and recruits Stormfront to take Translucent's place in the Seven. He later removes Stormfront from the Seven after her Nazi past is leaked to the public. In season three, Edgar is revealed to be the adoptive father of Victoria Neuman amidst attempts to bring Vought back to being a pharmaceutical company. After Victoria exposes some of his illegal activities, Edgar privately expresses admiration for her actions while publicly taking a temporary leave of absence despite knowing Homelander put her up to it, calling him "bad product". Esposito also voices Stan Edgar in The Boys Presents: Diabolical episode "One Plus One Equals Two".

Jess Bradley
Jessica A. "Jess" Bradley is a senior VA officer, introduced in #39 as an intelligent career-climber who was attempting to get in with the Vought Guy. In #40, she was taken on as his confidant and protégé, and he told her that her work had gotten her noticed years ago – he was merely waiting for her to speak to him. Their relationship soon becomes a strong one, with her appearing to develop feelings for him and the Vought Guy marking her out as vital to VA's future; in #61, she admits she feels safe around him and he admits he can relax around her.

She is more worried about the seedier, more uncontrollable aspects of the superheroes than the Vought Guy is, and is visibly sickened by the photographs of the Homelander's rampage. She is the first of Vought's executives to express that more concern should be shown for the victims of the superheroes actions, in particular after reviewing Hughie's file. In #48, Bradley was present for Black Noir's disastrous attempt at flying a plane and the murder of his flight instructor; she was left covered in the dead man's blood, and had to struggle to keep calm afterwards, telling herself "he's [the Vought Guy's] strong so you're strong". This led to her pointing out to the Vought Guy that Black Noir can not ever be taught to fly and it was wasting money to keep trying; he was convinced and cancelled any further training, but it appears Bradley was the first senior VA worker to raise this as an issue.

After the Homelander's coup is crushed, Bradley appears before Congress, and spends a great deal of time with the Vought Guy. She would subsequently be betrayed by him when, during his appearance before Congress as "whistleblower J. Stillwell", the Vought Guy shifts the blame for the disaster from Vought-American onto Bradley. The Vought Guy had realized long ago that a disaster was looming with its superheroes, and had promoted Bradley to a leadership position specifically so that he could scapegoat her when that happened, portraying her as a rogue element who could be held culpable for all the company's misdeeds. The realization of his complete betrayal causes Bradley to have a breakdown in her hotel room, tearing out her hair while screaming.

In the television series, Ashley J. Barrett is Vought International's new publicist and Director of Talent Relations, portrayed by Colby Minifie. While she is initially fired by Madelyn Stillwell in the first season following Starlight publicly commenting on her sexual assault by the Deep, Homelander has her rehired in the second season as the new Senior Vice President of Hero Management so he can use her to spy on Stan Edgar. In the third season following Edgar's leave of absence, Barrett takes his place as the CEO of Vought while continuing to serve under Homelander and develops a form of paraphilia. Throughout the second and third seasons, she slowly loses her hair, a symptom of fear-induced stress, which eventually culminates in tearing out a majority of it and wearing a wig.

Minifie also voices Ashley Barrett in The Boys Presents: Diabolical episode "Boyd in 3D".

Jonah Vogelbaum
Jonah Vogelbaum is a Jewish scientist at Vought-American who was responsible for creating Compound V for the Nazis until he took it and his only-living test subject Stormfront to the United States. It is here where he started to work for Vought-American and using Compound V to create superheroes. Greg Mallory later had Jonah work with the C.I.A. and inject members of the Boys with Compound V as well. When Mallory ordered Billy Butcher to eliminate Jonah, Billy spared him instead and had him work on a way to exterminate anyone with Compound V in them. Once this was done, Billy killed Jonah so that his work can be undone.

In the television series, Jonah Vogelbaum is portrayed by John Doman. This version is the CSO of Vought International and Homelander's creator. Sometime after he retired, Vogelbaum is visited by Homelander, who demands the truth about Becca Butcher and the latter's baby. Vogelbaum apologizes for his actions, though Homelander thinks otherwise. When Homelander confronts Billy Butcher and Madelyn Stillwell, he claims to have returned to Vogelbaum and "squeezed the truth" out of him. Homelander later claims that Vogelbaum was paralyzed in an accident. Butcher eventually manages to find Vogelbaum and brings him to a congressional hearing against Vought, but the latter is among those assassinated by Congresswoman Victoria K. "Vic" Neuman.

The comic book version of Vogelbaum and creator of Compound V is additionally adapted as German scientist and first CEO of Vought International, the husband of Stormfront.

Minor members
 Brewster: The Vought Guy's scapegoat who becomes the new CEO in issue #39.
 Seth Reed: A public relations writer at Vought International who appears exclusively in the live-action TV series adaptation, portrayed by Malcolm Barrett. Following a date with the Supe Ice Princess, he was accidentally frozen, lost his penis, and joined a support group for individuals who were harmed by Supes.
 Evan Lambert: A public relations writer who works with Seth Reed at Vought International who appears exclusively in the live-action TV series adaptation, portrayed by David Reale.
 Courtenay: A production assistant at Vought International who appears exclusively in the live-action TV series adaptation, portrayed by Jackie Tohn.
 Anika: A member of Vought International's Crime Analytics who appears exclusively in the live-action TV series adaptation, portrayed by Ana Sani.
 "Also Ashley": The assistant of Ashley Barrett who is also named Ashley and a member of Vought who appears exclusively in the live-action TV series adaptation, portrayed by Sabrina Saudin.
 Bill Marsh: A member of Vought International's board of directors who appears exclusively the live-action TV series adaption, portrayed by Doug Macleod.
 Pat Willis: A member of Vought International's board of directors who appears exclusively in the live-action TV series adaption, portrayed by Glenn McDonald.
 Maureen: A member of Vought International's board of directors who appears exclusively in the live-action TV series adaption, portrayed by Vania Giusto.
 Superbrain: The head of Vought International's Vought-doption Center and a Supe with an enlarged head and psychic powers who appears exclusively in The Boys Presents: Diabolical episode "Laser Baby's Day Out", voiced by Fred Tatasciore. After learning Vought scientist, Simon, snuck out "Laser Baby", Superbrain tries to kill him, only to be killed by Laser Baby.
  and : Celebrity Vought scientists, voiced by Kumail Nanjiani and Emily V. Gordon respectively. In The Boys Presents: Diabolical episode "Boyd in 3D", they develop an experimental Compound-V infused facial cream called Envision with the intention of allowing users to reshape their bodies into their ideal selves as part of Stan Edgar's plan to move Vought away from Supes and back to their pharmaceutical and military-focused roots. After hiring Boyd Doone as a product tester, his head explodes from using excess cream, though Vik and Erin continue their work. Vik also appears in the live-action TV series adaptation episode "Herogasm", with Nanjiani reprising his role.

Other superheroes
In the universe of The Boys, superheroes (also known as "Supes") get their powers from the drug Compound V, which was first created by Nazi scientists in the 1930s and which has since entered the gene pool due to VA complacency on numerous occasions. The defense contractor Vought-American has close ties to most of the superheroes, directly owns several of them, and is responsible for the creation of the original Seven; they also created and own Young Americans, Teenage Kix, Payback, and the G-Men.

The vast majority of superheroes in the series are narcissistic, hedonistic, and psychopathic, committing numerous crimes against civilians and each other out of a belief that their social privilege status allows them to do whatever they want. Most of the heroes shown in the series are also utterly incompetent, as they were not trained in counter-terrorism, Urban warfare tactics, police procedure, or rescue operations so as to avoid the wrath of the police and military whom they would effectively replace. The Seven are especially notorious, and use Vought-American's money to fund a lavish and amoral lifestyle. However, the superheroes are careful not to offend VA lest they lose their cash flow.

Young Americans
One of the two major teenage superhero teams, the Young Americans are clean-cut and patriotic; they have ties to the Young Republicans, Christian youth groups (including one known as Capes for Christ), and other conservative organizations. Like so many things in the Boys stories, the Young Americans' squeaky-clean pious appearance is mostly for show, although they kept their more questionable habits secret from Starlight and the public. When she left the team to join the Seven they apparently "relaxed" a little. Aside from Starlight, the Young Americans has at least four members:

Drummer Boy
Drummer Boy is identified as the leader in #6. Conservative Christian. Was involved with Starlight. Was caught by Starlight having sex with Holy Mary.

In the television series, Drummer Boy is portrayed by Miles Gaston Villanueva with Luca Oriel portraying him as a teenager. This version, also known as Alex, is a former pop star and Starlight's childhood friend and ex-boyfriend who rebranded himself to Supersonic. After being mentioned in season one, he debuts in season three as a contestant on the reality show American Hero. While competing for a spot on the Seven, he displays an amicable rapport with Starlight. After winning, she tries to convince him to decline due to Homelander's unstable nature, but Alex refuses in order to protect her. He briefly joins the Seven and takes part in Starlight's plot to stand up to Homelander, but is killed off-screen by him after A-Train sells him out to Homelander as a traitor. His death is later covered up and spun as a drug overdose.

Minor members
 The Standard: A member of the Young Americans. Red, blue and yellow costume, has the power of flight. Elected as the original leader of the Young Americans.
 General Issue: A Supe who normally wears camouflage pants and a white tank top with a Vietnam War era green army jacket and also goes simply by the General.
 Holy Mary: A Supe who dresses in a nun's habit and fishnet stockings. She is caught by Starlight sleeping with Drummer Boy.

Fantastico
Fantastico are a group of four heroes consisting of the Doofer, a Supe who resembles a humanoid assembly of bricks who appears to suffer a fatal drug overdose during Herogasm; Reacher Dick; Invisi-Lass, and an unnamed pyrokinetic Supe who appear in Herogasm #3.

Teenage Kix
A major teenage group with a more rebellious, Generation Y image. A-Train is a former member of the group. On reforming the Boys, Butcher planned his first operation against them. The team frequently goes to brothels to "celebrate" after a victory. The group is defeated by the Boys in issue #6, with Wee Hughie accidentally killing Blarney Cock.

Popclaw
Popclaw has retractable claws, which she uses to practice self mutilation. It is revealed in issue #9 that she had her claws coated in metal.

In the live-action TV series adaptation, Popclaw is portrayed Brittany Allen. This version, aka Charlotte, is the girlfriend of A-Train who shares his addiction to Compound V and was once a celebrity movie star whose career was ruined by the paparazzi, leading to her getting work in D-List movies. After she accidentally kills her landlord, the Boys blackmail her into spying on the Seven for them, leading to A-Train murdering her on Homelander's orders.

Blarney Cock
Blarney Cock is Irish and extremely racist. Along with his best friend Whack Job, he steals painkillers from a children's hospital to support their drug habits. In issue #6 he is accidentally killed by Wee Hughie, after which it is discovered that he has a taped-up hamster inserted in his anus. He is given a hero's funeral. After returning from the dead, his sole focus is to get his hamster back; Wee Hughie is ordered to kill him a second time by The Legend, after which The Legend reveals that Blarney Cock is his son. Hughie cremates his corpse in an oil drum after killing him the second time.

In issue #54 it is revealed that Blarney Cock is the son of Queen Maeve and The Legend. Butcher learns from Doc Peculiar's files that Blarney was shipped off to Ireland after Maeve gave birth to him and adopted by a local family, indicating that he had no clue of his true parentage, with Butcher stating he was "farmed out to some kid's home in Paddy land."

Gunpowder
Gunpowder is a fire-breathing member of Teenage Kix who brings an NRA sponsorship into the fold.

In the live-action TV series adaptation, Gunpowder is portrayed by Sean Patrick Flanery in the present and Gattlin Griffith in flashbacks. This version is a member of Payback and the former sidekick of the abusive Soldier Boy who possesses several firearms and expert marksmanship instead of the comics incarnation's fire breath. Butcher finds and interrogates Gunpowder for Soldier Boy's whereabouts, but the latter drives him off. After taking V24 to temporarily grant himself superpowers, Butcher successfully overpowers and interrogates Gunpowder, who reveals everything he knows before Butcher kills him with his newfound super-strength and laser vision.

Minor members
 Big Game: The leader of the group. It is implied by Butcher that it is he that is able to keep the rest of the group in line. He is shown to be bisexual, as he has sex with not just women, but also fellow team members Shout Out and DogKnott. He is one of the only leaders of the various teams that does show any semblance of how to properly use their abilities from a tactical standpoint, though this is promptly negated by the Boys in their only encounter.
 DogKnott: A Supe with werewolf-like appearance, but wears clothes due to his self-esteem issues, razor sharp claws, and can jump up to 20 feet.
 Whack Job: A Mohawk-wearing member of Teenage Kix with electrokinesis who dresses in punk attire. He and Blarney Cock have been best friends for years, and it is indicated that if either was kicked off the team, the other would follow. He reacted badly to Blarney's death, appearing to sink into a deep depression. He was the only member of the team happy to have Blarney back after he rose from the dead. He was present at Herogasm along with the rest of the superhero community.
 Shout-Out: An African-American Supe who is thought publicly to be gay. He does not get along with Blarney Cock, as the two constantly shoot racial slurs at each other. Due to the Boys, he resigns from the team after announcing his homosexuality, but he does show up to fight the Boys after Homelander reveals the perpetrators. During the fight, he has both of his thumbs ripped off by Butcher. Shout Out has the power of flight and electrical abilities.
 Charles / Mesmer: A member of Teenage Kix who possesses the ability to read people's thoughts through physical contact and appears exclusively in the live-action TV series adaptation, portrayed by Haley Joel Osment. He. As a child actor, he played the lead (a fictionalized version of himself) in the police procedural drama The Mesmerizer. Having fallen from grace after allegedly using his power for insider trading, his main source of income is his attendances and autograph signings at superhero conventions. Mother's Milk and Frenchie request his assistance, in exchange for visits with his estranged daughter, in uncovering Kimiko's background and learn about Vought's plan to create superpowered terrorists. Afterward, Mesmer betrays the Boys to Homelander in order to restore his standing as a superhero. In retaliation, Butcher tracks Mesmer down and kills him.

Payback
Payback is a successor to the group "The Avenging Squad", which was created back in the 1940s, intended for use against Nazi Germany – but failed disastrously, and were wiped out swiftly in the Battle of the Bulge. In 1950, Vought created a second version called "Crimefighters Incorporated" and used them as stepping stones for future superheroes like the Homelander.

Loosely based on the Avengers, it is stated in Herogasm #2 that every member has tried to join the Seven.

Despite the presence of some powerful superhumans, a direct encounter with The Boys resulted in the team's destruction. Garth Ennis stated this was "because they don't know what they're doing with the (considerable) resources they command".

Soldier Boy

Tek Knight
Tek Knight is one of the founding members of Payback. Prior to his association with Payback, he previously led a group known as the Maverikz (who in turn were savagely beaten by The Boys in issue #31). The current Tek Knight is actually the third person to hold the identity. Two prior incarnations of Tek Knight, originally called Steel Knight, were introduced in Issues 52 to 54, as well as prior versions of sidekick Laddio. Mallory says they revamped his "franchise" later. Issue #9 gives his name as Robert Vernon.

Tek Knight is a vastly different hero from his predecessors, which were portrayed as super strong heroes with a helm and a jet pack. Having not received a dose of Compound V, Tek Knight instead has a technologically advanced suit, with which he operates. The abilities of the suit are not fully described. Despite possessing the ability to fly, Tek Knight also makes use of several vehicles and operates out of a cave based headquarters.

Tek Knight is one of the few heroes that is shown to have a boy sidekick, named Laddio. The current Laddio is actually the third to hold the name, as the first was killed during the Battle of the Bulge and the second would go on to pursue a solo career as the hero Swingwing. Tek Knight also is shown to have an associate called the Talon, who switches back and forth between ally and adversary.

Tek Knight was one of the few heroes to never engage the Boys' attention, as he never did anything depraved or morally wrong like many other "Heroes". Butcher describes him as boring, and seemed to be a genuinely nice person, though highly homophobic. Soldier Boy states in Herogasm that he was one of the only members in Payback to be nice to him.

Tek Knight's career would end after a murder of a young gay man that was being investigated by the Boys coincided with the growth of a brain tumor "the size of a fist", which caused an overpowering desire to have sex with anything. This would cause him to dismiss Laddio; upon realizing his compulsion was causing him to consider sex with his young ward, he immediately acted to remove the temptation and avoid any chance of his acting on it. Though he was cleared of having anything to do with the murder by Butcher and company, his butler would later release details about Tek Knight's sexual compulsions, leaving him being dubbed in the press as the "Homo Hero" and would be dismissed from Payback. He would die shortly afterward, when a wheelbarrow full of bricks landed on his head while he was saving a mother and child from being crushed by it. In his head, Tek Knight died a hero, as he hallucinated himself saving the world by having sex with a meteorite.

Swatto
Swatto is a member of Payback who can fly with a pair of retractable insect wings. He cannot speak, only capable of "buzzing", though Mind Droid is able to translate for him. Butcher kills Swatto with a pickaxe in issue #33. His predecessors in 1944 and 1950 were called "The Buzzer".

In the television series, Swatto is portrayed by Joel Labelle. This version is shown to be perfectly capable of speech. During flashbacks to 1984 depicted in season three, he joined Payback on a mission to Nicaragua, but was killed by Nicaraguan and Russian soldiers.

Mind Droid
Mind Droid is a member of Payback. Described as a "Telepathic Android", although he reveals in issue #33 that he is in fact human. He possesses mild telepathy, and is able to fly with the use of a jetpack. First victim of Tek Knight's sexual disorder. Apparently involved in an open relationship with Crimson Countess. Is decapitated by Butcher in issue #33. In 1944 and 1950, this character's predecessor was called Manbot.

In the live-action television series adaptation, Mind Droid's name is changed to Mindstorm and is portrayed by Ryan Blakely. This version does not pass himself off as an android, and has more advanced telepathic abilities. Mindstorm is capable of reading the thoughts of everyone within a three-mile radius of himself, he can trap people in their own minds, forcing them to relive their own nightmares until they die of dehydration, and he is also capable of mind control. Following a failed mission in Nicaragua and selling out his leader Soldier Boy to the Russians in 1984, Mindstorm became a recluse in the present due to his powers. While being hunted by Soldier Boy, Butcher, and Hughie, Mindstorm uses his powers on Butcher. Hughie, having become disillusioned with Soldier Boy due to his fabricated origin story, begs Mindstorm to free Butcher, promising to teleport him to safety in exchange. However, Soldier Boy kills Mindstorm after the latter reveals Homelander is Soldier Boy's biological son.

Crimson Countess
Crimson Countess is a member of Payback who possesses heat-related powers. She is involved with Mind Droid and it is hinted at that she is having an affair with Stormfront. Butcher breaks her neck for attacking his dog Terror in issue #32. She is the third individual to hold the title of Crimson Countess, with the first having been killed in the Second World War at the Battle of the Bulge with the rest of her Avenging Squad in 1944, and the second serving to impersonate them in the aftermath of the war for the making of propaganda films from 1950 onward.

In the live-action television series adaptation, Crimson Countess is portrayed by Laurie Holden. This version utilizes deadly fireballs, and requires her fingers to be touching to activate her powers. She pretended to be romantically involved with Payback's leader Soldier Boy for media purposes despite hating him, and owns a chimpanzee sanctuary called Chimp County. In 1984, she and Payback partook in a failed mission in Nicaragua, during which they sold out Soldier Boy to the Russians on Vought's behalf. In the present day, she continues to work for Vought, performing at Voughtland, and as a cam girl. When Frenchie and Kimiko try to interrogate her, Countess escapes, accidentally killing a Homelander mascot with her powers in the process. She is later captured by the Boys so they can form an alliance with Soldier Boy, who kills her upon learning of what she did to him.

Eagle the Archer
Eagle the Archer is mentioned, but seen only on the cover of a Vought-American comic shown to Hughie in issue #20. In issue #9, Butcher informs Tek Knight that six years ago Eagle the Archer "got coked off his tits" and beat his girlfriend into a coma. Butcher blackmailed him in exchange for information on all of his teammates.

In the live-action TV series adaptation, Eagle the Archer is portrayed by Langston Kerman. In his early life, he fought criminals, but innocent lives were killed whenever he ran out of arrows, which eventually led to him joining the Church of the Collective. After the Deep is arrested, Eagle bails him out and helps him join the Church as well. After the Deep recruits A-Train however, Eagle is accused of betraying the Church when he refuses to cease contact with his mother. In response, the Church anonymously uploads a sexually compromising video of Eagle to the internet, publicly embarrassing him. In the YouTube web series Seven on 7, following his public embarrassment, Eagle is reported to have abandoned his role as a superhero to rebrand himself as a rapper.

TNT Twins
The TNT Twins, consisting of Tommy and Tessa TNT, are members of Payback capable of shooting electricity while holding hands exclusive to the live-action television series adaptation, portrayed by Jack Doolan and Kristin Booth. Following a failed mission in Nicaragua and selling out their leader Soldier Boy in 1984, the TNT Twins became the hosts of the annual Herogasm event in the present. After the Boys and Soldier Boy find them, with the latter seeking revenge on the twins, they claim that Black Noir sold him out and attempt to defend themselves with their powers, only to produce sputtering sparks due to not using them for years before Soldier Boy accidentally releases an energy blast that kills the twins and most of the Herogasm attendees.

G-Men
First mentioned in issue #7. Loosely based on the X-Men and Doom Patrol, the G-Men are Vought-American's most profitable team, as well as their most popular, due to their image as downtrodden outcasts, orphans and runaways, despite the fact that all of them are extremely rich. They also have six sister-teams; these include: G-Force, The G-Brits, The G-Nomads, G-Coast, G-Style and G-Wiz. There is also a preschooler group called Pre-Wiz, which Vought tried to stop Godolkin from forming. Outside of G-Wiz and Pre-Wiz, the entirety of the G-Men hate each other. Unlike the other superhero teams in The Boys Universe, the G-Men were formed independently by John Godolkin. Upon the original team being deemed ready, Godolkin would solicit a working relationship with Vought-American, giving the group some independence to operate.

G-Coast and G-Style are entirely African-American, and are constantly engaged in ridiculous feuds, mainly over the death of one of their members, 2-Cool which they each blame each other for. Outside of Nubia, the other teams seem to lack any black members. According to Dime-Bag (a black youth) in #28, when he graduates from G-Wiz he will have to join either G-Coast or G-Style.

It was revealed that Godolkin kidnapped them from their families as children and conditioned them to love being G-Men by giving them an endless supply of whatever they wanted. He also sexually abuses them from a young age, with assistance from some of the other G-Men.

Vought-American executives eventually determined that Godolkin and the G-Teams were a public relations liability, and they were massacred by heavily armed Red River operatives. Pre-Wiz was "dealt with" by being consigned to a shipping container and dumped from a cargo plane mid-flight, off the coast of Iceland.

John Godolkin
John Godolkin is the team's founder, depicted as an unrepentant pedophile and kidnapper. Incidentally it is implied that he may have been similarly abused by his own father. He appears to have no powers, unlike his students. Five-Oh, the team's field leader, does not like when Godolkin professes to be one of "them" (the outcast G-Men). Even though the G-Men hate Godolkin, they are almost totally loyal to him. For example, Five-Oh, who privately mocks and detests Godolkin, is seen dying on behalf of his honor when they are massacred. In addition Randall, who has an otherwise rebellious streak, unquestioningly carries out unspoken orders to kill Hughie.

John Godolkin is tolerated by Vought because his team, the G-Men, and their spin-offs have proven to be the most bankable superhero team. John Godolkin's behavior is uncontrollable, and eventually Vought becomes concerned with his perversions and instability, which causes them to terminate the entire group.

Godolkin's has a penchant for obtuse and dramatic speeches and could be accused of being intentionally pretentious. The content of his speeches tend to characterize non-superhumans as cruel oppressors of the G-Men and their kind. Godolkin professes to "love all his children" yet will callously order their deaths if any of them threaten to reveal the G-Men's dark secrets. At the same time, he desperately wants any deceased G-Men to be resurrected (as V can do); he continues to want this even after seeing the mental state of Nubia, much to the concern and disgust of both the G-Men and Vought.

John Godolkin will appear in the live-action spin-off television series The Boys Presents: Varsity, depicted as the founder of the Godolkin University School of Crimefighting.

Five-Oh
Five-Oh wears a uniform/helmet reminiscent of a motorcycle cop, with "energy beams" leaking from the goggles. He seems to be fiercely loyal to Godolkin's G-Men, which is evidenced in issue #29 where he defends Godolkin's honor before being killed. Five-Oh indicates that the money may be what drives him and "the other stuff" (Godolkin's sexual abuse) is something a G-Man learns to "cope" with.

Aside from his loyalty and apparent leadership, he is depicted as stoic and rather curt with people. He mocks and derides most of his teammates and mentor Godolkin behind their backs. He especially has ire towards Silver Kincaid, whom he refers to as a "tease" who can "[go to] hell", possibly indicating some unrequited sexual advances. Five-Oh does seem to have a close friendship with Cold Snap, who is seen with him the most of any character.

Cold Snap
Cold Snap possesses temperature manipulation and was one of the five original G-Men, and is a leader of the G-Force sub-team. Cold Snap is genuinely nice to most of his teammates, if not a little over-eager and naïve. He is the first character to allude to Godolkin pedophilia and even openly questions some of the G-Men's practices to Five-Oh. Cold-Snap appears well liked by most of his teammates, even Critter who otherwise seems to hate and loathe everyone else. When G-Style and G-Coast come to visit he suggests to Five-Oh that they can set a moral example by "showing some leadership" while the rest of the team simply makes racist cracks. Cold Snap is seen in the front lines during the G-Men massacre.

In the live-action TV series adaptation, Cold Snap is portrayed by Shaun Mazzococca. This version is a lower-tier Supe charged with domestic abuse by the Federal Bureau of Superhuman Affairs (FBSA) and is among the Supes attending the TNT Twins' Herogasm event.

Silver Kincaid
Silver Kincaid is deceased via suicide. Wielder of gravity and pressure related powers. One of the original G-Men and the one who killed Nubia at Godolkin's order, as well as other "off-message" supes for Vought. After killing Nubia, she reached out to the CIA in desperation over the state of the G-Men; Rayner tried to turn her into a spy, further destabilising her mental state, and eventually causing her to suffer a psychotic breakdown where she mentally regressed back to when she was initially kidnapped. Her resulting public suicide triggered the Boys' investigation of the G-Men, and it was discovered that the place where she killed herself was the town where Godolkin first abducted her. Comments after her death imply the other G-Men detested her, especially Five-Oh (who refers to her as "cock teasing"). Her real name was revealed to be Grace Wilhelm.

In the live-action television series adaptation, Silver Kincaid is portrayed by Jasmin Husain. She competes on the reality show American Hero for a spot on the Seven. She is chosen by Starlight, but Ashley Barrett and Homelander reject Kincaid for being Muslim and the latter chooses the Deep to return to the Seven instead.

Nubia
Nubia is a member of the G-Men with thunder and lightning-based powers who was killed by Silver Kincaid and reanimated as a zombie that the other G-Men care for.

Nubia appears in the animated TV series The Boys Presents: Diabolical episode "Nubian vs Nubian", voiced by Aisha Tyler. An African-American woman who masquerades as a Nubian superhero with help from Vought, she marries the similarly-themed Nubian Prince and they have a daughter named Maya. Eight years later, the Nubians begin filing for divorce due to a lack of passion in their relationship outside of fighting. Maya attempts to "parent trap" them back together, but they continue fighting, leading Maya to sign their divorce papers herself and blackmail them into getting her a pony.

Critter
Critter is very tall and furry. Wears an Elizabethan collar around his neck and boxing gloves on his hands to keep from scratching. Shown to be extremely homophobic, racist and generally irritable towards everyone. During a brunch with Godolkin and the first two G-teams he actually confronted Godolkin about his constant acquisition of new members, how it increased the likelihood of their secret being found out, and asked when it would stop. His lower torso was blown apart during Vought's destruction of the G-Men.

Groundhawk
Groundhawk has a temperamental personality and sledgehammers for hands. He is always saying "gonna...gonna." Apparently the "hammer-hands" are a permanent fixture indicated by his inability to eat or drink during the G-Men brunch without some assistance from other members. Darick Robertson picked Groundhawk as his favorite of the new characters calling him "utterly ridiculous".

Groundhawk appears in the animated TV series The Boys Presents: Diabolical episode "Nubian vs Nubian", voiced by John DiMaggio. This version is employed by Vought as a "nemesis" for new heroes. Due to his involvement in her parents getting married and having her, Maya blackmails Groundhawk into helping her stop their impending divorce. However, Maya's parents beat Groundhawk into a near-death state.

Minor members
 The Divine: A flamboyant, gay Supe who constantly facing rude remarks from the others (particularly Critter). Has been shown assisting Nubia, as well as helping Groundhawk eat, and was calm and uncomplaining in both cases. He seems to possess some telepathic abilities, as well as flight.
 The Flamer: An openly-gay, heavily scarred Supe with pyrokinesis who is in a relationship with the Divine.
 Europo: A purple-skinned, demonic, and comedic Supe with powers of teleportation and enhanced strength.
 Stacker: A taciturn member of the G-Men made of a shiny, dark-coloured metal.
 Pusspuss: A female feline member of G-Force.
 Luckless: A Supe with red hair, dark black skin, and a white stripe down her face.

G-Wiz
G-Wiz is a G-Men spin-off group that Hughie infiltrated as "Bagpipe". G-Wiz headquarters is located down the road from the G-Mansion in a fraternity house; they spend most of their time partying. They're sexually confused and are unaware of appropriate boundaries & limits due to how Godolkin raised them. Hughie openly pities them, while also being disgusted and disturbed by their odd pastimes. They are killed by the Boys after Hughie's cover is blown, except for Dime-Bag, who ends up getting interrogated before he is killed by Europo. G-Wiz consists of the following:

 Randall / Buzz Cut
 Gary / Pinwheel: A gray-skinned Supe with psychic powers.
 Jamal / Dime-Bag: A Supe who reluctantly reveals Godolkin's secrets to the Boys before he is killed by Europo.
  Matthew Verbin / Jetlag: A narcissistic Supe who can manipulate time to make it 3:00 p.m., but cannot go more than twelve hours forward and never back in time to change events. He jumps seven hours into the future to escape an ambush arranged by the Boys, only to be confronted by a waiting Butcher, who kills him with a carbon-fiber driveshaft.
 Weezer / Airburst: A Supe who wears an aviator hat and flight goggles.
 Blowchowski / Discharge: A Supe who can produce acidic vomit and engages in several forms of sexually perverted play with, especially peeing on, the other members. In the live-action TV series adaptation episode "The Bloody Doors Off", Discharge appears as one of Vought's test subjects held within the Sage Grove psychiatric hospital. When the Boys and Lamplighter accidentally cause a riot, Discharge attacks the latter before Kimiko kills him with his own acidic vomit.
 The Dude With No Name: A Supe with a metal arm and leg whose face is covered in bandages.

Paralactic
Paralactic is cybernetically-enhanced team of formerly disabled heroes that Frenchie refers as "The Six Million Dollar Heroes" and described by Ennis as "a '90s-style cyberpunk outfit, with lots of prosthetic limbs and biomechanical organs and attachments." The team consists of Trojan, Astroglide, Lady Arklite, Strap-on, Stopcock, The Truncheon.

Team Titanic
Team Titanic, as described by Ennis, is "a team of grown-up sidekicks" who were created by Vought-American to appeal to the teenage market, though they disband and reorganize them every few years. Based in Cleveland and living in "Star Tower", the team has consisted of Country Mama, Dry-Hump, Earl Mulch, Gumchum, Jimmy the One, Muzzeltov, Regina Dentata, Snaffletwat, and the Starlike. Additionally, Malchemical was formerly part of the team before he was reassigned to Super Duper as punishment for using his shape-shifting abilities to trick the Starlike into having sex with him.

Oh Father
Oh Father is an African-American superhero and preacher in a mega-church, first introduced in Issue #45. Homelander seeks him out during the Believe religious festival, explains his plan to help Vought introduce Supes to the US Military and asks Oh Father to set up a meeting with all the Supes who could be trusted to follow the Homelander's orders. Homelander claims that Oh Father is the best person to set up the meeting because, "You know everyone."

Oh Father leads a group of 12 children who possess superpowers. The name of the group is Sidekicks 12, a reference to the 12 Apostles. It is strongly implied that Oh Father sexually abuses the children, with Butcher referring to him as a "pedo". Homelander tells him that he "must do something about this addiction to sidekicks. I'm serious, you animal. There's blood on one of those seats". Homelander makes these remarks in friendly conversation and clearly feels no true repugnance toward Oh Father's molestation.

Oh Father has demonstrated the powers of flight and enhanced strength. In issue #64, Oh Father shatters a reporter's jaw with a single backhand slap after the reporter confronts him about a medical report that shows evidence of Oh Father's sexual abuse of Sidekicks 12.

In issue #65, Oh Father and the rest of the superheroes who possess the power of flight are killed in combat against the US Air Force, who are armed with missiles configured to home in on Compound V-infused targets.

In the live-action television adaptation,  is depicted as an elastic Christian Supe, portrayed by Shaun Benson. While he promotes Christianity and denounces homosexuality, Ezekiel displays a closeted gay personality, which the Boys use to blackmail him into giving up information on Compound V.

Maverikz
The Maverikz are a superhero group, originally lead by Tek Knight. After Tek Knight left some time in the past to found Payback, the Maverikz remained as a leaderless C-list superhero team. They are seen in issue #31, after being called in by Vought to eliminate the Boys. The Boys brutally beat them, and Hughie madly batters one of the Maverikz members until Butcher steps in. Hughie later has a flashback to the fight in issue #45. Several members of The Maverikz, now bearing the scars of their previous brutal beating, are also seen speaking to Oh Father during the supes attack on the Pentagon in issue #64.

Television-exclusive superheroes
 Nubian Prince: An African American Supe who masquerades as his namesake with help from Vought, portrayed by an uncredited actor in the live-action TV series adaptation and voiced by Don Cheadle in The Boys Presents: Diabolical episode "Nubian vs. Nubian". Eight years prior to the latter series, Nubian Prince and the similarly-themed superhero Nubia get married and have a daughter named Maya. In the present, the Nubians begin filing for divorce in spite of Maya's failed attempt at getting them back together.
 Doppelgänger: A shapeshifting Supe and operative of Vought who appears exclusively in The Boys live-action TV series adaptation, portrayed by Dan Darin-Zanco. Madelyn Stillwell tasks him with seducing Senator Calhoun when he turned down the idea of having Supes in the military. After assuming the form of a young woman to seduce and capture Calhoun, Doppelgänger takes pictures of the encounter to blackmail him into sponsoring a bill to militarize Supes. In season two, Doppelgänger meets with Homelander and uses their powers to fulfill the latter's unique sexual fantasies before Homelander kills them for trying to exploit his narcissism.
 Shockwave: A speedster who appears exclusively in The Boys live-action TV series adaptation, portrayed by Mishka Thébaud. In season one, he competes against and loses to A-Train in a foot race due to the latter's use of Compound V. In season two, when A-Train is put on a medical leave and suffers subsequent heart palpitations, Shockwave is approached by Vought to join the Seven, potentially taking over the title and branding rights of "A-Train", before being killed by Congresswoman Victoria Neuman during a congressional hearing against the company.
 Blindspot: A blind Supe with superhuman hearing, portrayed by Chris Mark. In The Boys live-action TV series adaptation, Ashley Barrett recommends him for the Seven as a replacement for Translucent, but Homelander grievously injures Blindspot as the former refuses to allow "cripple[s]" into the Seven. In the web series Seven on 7, Blindspot is revealed to have eventually died from these injuries, with a cover story stating that he had been on a mission to Argentina.
 Gecko: An ex-superhero with superhuman regeneration who appears exclusively in The Boys live-action TV series adaptation, portrayed by David W. Thompson. After retiring as a superhero, Gecko became a technician at Vought International while secretly engaging in S&M acts and using his powers to sell his body parts for money. Starlight finds out about the latter and uses it to blackmail Gecko into procuring Compound V for her.
 Termite: A Supe with the ability to shrink who appears exclusively in The Boys live-action TV series adaptation, portrayed by Brett Geddes. Following a CGI cameo in the first season, the Boys shadow him in the third season as he has sex with and accidentally kills his boyfriend after unintentionally returning to his normal size while inside his boyfriend's genitals. Upon discovering them, Termite attempts to kill the Boys before Butcher puts the miniature Termite in a bag of cocaine, causing him to overdose. To Butcher's anger, Termite is hospitalized instead of arrested because of Vought and Termite's contract with Terminix. Following this, Termite attends Herogasm, during which he is wounded by Soldier Boy's energy blast, trapped in his miniaturized state, and killed by Homelander.
 Moonshadow: An African-American superhero who appears exclusively in The Boys live-action TV series adaptation episode "Barbary Coast", portrayed by Abigail Whitney. She competes for a spot in the Seven in the reality show American Hero, in which she becomes a finalist before losing to Supersonic and the Deep.
 Blue Hawk: A New Jersey-based Supe who appears exclusively in The Boys live-action adaptation, portrayed by Nick Wechsler. Due to his use of excessive force against African-American individuals, A-Train and Ashley Barrett arrange for him to issue a public apology. However, Blue Hawk and several of the attendees incite a violent confrontation, resulting in innocents being injured, and A-Train's brother being paralyzed. Blue Hawk later claims he was standing up to a bunch of "bad apples" and Antifa. While attending Herogasm, Blue Hawk survives Soldier Boy's inadvertent attack before he is killed by A-Train. After A-Train suffers heart failure, Blue Hawk's heart is transplanted into him while Vought covers up the latter's death.
 Great Wide Wonder: A Supe who can fly at supersonic speed who appears exclusively in The Boys Presents: Diabolical animated series episode "I'm Your Pusher", voiced by Michael Cera. In retaliation for him taking female college students into Earth's orbit to have sex before leaving them in space, Butcher threatens the Great Wide Wonder's drug dealer OD into spiking his heroin enema with a chemical Frenchie developed to make the former lose control and kill himself.
 Ironcast: An overweight Supe with super-strength and skin made of iron who appears exclusively in The Boys Presents: Diabolical animated series episode "I'm Your Pusher", voiced by Kevin Michael Richardson. The Boys target him in retaliation for him drinking terminally ill children's blood to treat his erectile dysfunction. While participating in a public event celebrating the Great Wide Wonder, Ironcast is killed by the former after he injects himself with spiked heroin and loses control of himself.

Other characters

Robin
Robin is Hughie's deceased girlfriend, who is killed due to the actions of A-Train in the first issue after they have their first kiss and express their mutual love to each other. Hughie is left in a traumatized state holding Robin's hands and forearms after A-Train causes another larger, horned super to fly into her and impact a nearby brick wall, embedding the rest of her into it.

In the television series, Robin Ward is portrayed by Jess Salgueiro. Here, rather than A-Train causing another supe to kill her, dashes through her body himself due to his use of Compound V.

Becky Saunders
Becky Saunders is Butcher's deceased wife, who was a social worker in 1980s London. She was able to convince Butcher to hold back his violent urges. Becky was also responsible for getting Butcher's mother to leave her abusive husband: Butcher and his brother both believed their mother could not make it without a husband, and it took Becky to make them see otherwise. Her full name was Rebecca Joanne Butcher.

While on vacation in Miami, Florida, she was raped by a superhero. Several months later, a fetus with laser eyes and the power of flight, bursts out killing her. In #65, it is revealed that she was raped by Black Noir wearing Homelander's costume.

In the TV series, Rebecca "Becca" Butcher is portrayed by Shantel VanSanten. Becca was Vought International's Senior Director of Digital Marketing who was coerced by Homelander into having sex with him. Butcher believed that Homelander killed her while Jonah Vogelbaum claimed to Homelander that Becca died giving birth, with the child drowning in its mother's blood. In the season one finale, it is revealed that Becca is still alive and caring for Homelander's son, Ryan. In season two, it is further revealed that Becca lives in a gated community-esque compound run by Vought after coming to them when she learned she had become pregnant with Ryan. She is reluctant to leave the compound due to how Butcher would react to Ryan. After Homelander and Stormfront take Ryan, Becca asks for Butcher's help in saving her son, but was accidentally killed by Ryan in his attempt to save her from Stormfront.

Love Sausage
Vasilii "Vas" Vorishikin is a Russian ex-cop, ex-tank commander, ex-superhero, communist, and current owner of a bar in Moscow with a penchant for drinking a beverage made from brake fluid that he passes off as vodka. As the Love Sausage, he used to be part of the Glorious Five Year Plan, a team of five government owned superheroes that also included the Tractor, Purge, Red Banner, and Collectivo in the days of the Soviet Union. He is nostalgic for the Soviet Union's principles and values and of his work in the Glorious Five Year Plan. His name comes from his foot-long, super-strong, and durable penis, though he cannot run straight whilst aroused. He describes large female breasts as his Kryptonite and lost two fingers after touching The Female.

Genuinely altruistic by nature, Vas is on friendly terms with the Boys, bonding with Hughie especially and is so far the only likable superhero that the Boys know of. While on a mission with the Boys in Issue #13, Vas' "vodka" saves him and Hughie from poison laced borscht while the rest of the team are incapacitated by the food. In Issue #34, Vas is later called in as reinforcement in the fight against Stormfront, and expresses contempt for corporate-backed superheroes. In issue #66, Butcher hunts and mortally wounds him with an enhanced RPG. In issue #67, the Legend comments Vas has been found dead. Before his death, he was able to send a text message to Hughie, which was a code for an email address. The account subsequently sent Hughie an out of office reply, revealing Vas' suspicions on his fate, as well as a link to data involving his suspicions about Butcher's true agenda.

A variation of Love Sausage appears in the live-action television adaptation, portrayed by Andrew Jackson in the second season and Derek Johns in the third. First appearing in the episode "The Bloody Doors Off", this version is a test subject for Vought's Compound V at a psychiatric hospital who gained a prehensile penis that can stretch to incredible lengths. He uses it to strangle Mother's Milk through a broken window before Kimiko knocks the former out. Following the hospital's rebranding as a wellness center in the web series Seven on 7 with Cameron Coleman, Love Sausage returns in the third season episode "Herogasm" as a participant in the titular event, during which he survives Soldier Boy's inadvertent attack, though his penis is burnt.

Super-Duper
Super-Duper are a group of low-powered, and in some cases, mentally challenged, teens who function more as a support group for the disabled living in a group home than as the sort of sadistic revelers comprising the rest of the Vought-American "heroes". Their uncharacteristically benign natures confuse Butcher, and Hughie befriends them when a deadlier new captain, Malchemical, is assigned to them as punishment for his actions in "The Innocents." They are a loose satire on the old-fashioned Legion of Super-Heroes, hopelessly inept and vulnerable in the corrupt world of the Boys. In addition to Malchemical, the team consists of Auntie Sis, Ladyfold, Stool Shadow, Kid Camo, Klanker, Black Hole, and Bobbie Badoing.

Ennis described the characters: "They're unique in the world of the Boys in that they actually are heroes – they believe in truth and justice, they fight to make the world a better place and ask nothing in return. They are, in short, a million miles from the scumbag supes we've seen up 'til now."

Terror
Terror is Billy Butcher's pet bulldog. He has been trained by Billy to fornicate with anything on the command, "Fuck it". If anyone tries to hurt Terror, Billy kills them. After the Crimson Countess flings Terror into a wall Billy hunts her down and strangles her and breaks her neck. Terror may be compound V enhanced as he was able to both wound the Crimson Countess and survive her throwing him into a wall without any obvious injuries. Terror seems to be liked by all The Boys, most notably Hughie and Female. Female is often seen playing with Terror or tickling his belly, Terror is seen lying in her room when she was injured by Stormfront apparently deeply depressed. After he is found dead, Female lays next to him.

In issue #59 following the Seven and the Boys' confrontation on top of the Flatiron Building, they discover Terror dead in their office. Butcher goes to Doc Peculiar's and takes Jack from Jupiter by surprise and brutally stabs him with a butcher knife over and over while repeatedly asked him why he killed Terror.

After being alluded to in the first season of the live-action television series adaptation, Terror appears in the second season living with Butcher's drug dealer aunt.

The comic book version of Terror appears in The Boys Presents: Diabolical animated series episode "I'm Your Pusher".

Proinsias

Proinsias, whose full name is Proinsias Cassidy, is an Irish bartender and former vampire, running the Irish pub "The Grassy Knoll" in New York City (a name originated from having originally planned on founding the bar in Dallas prior to losing his vampirism). Having been drinking buddies with Billy Butcher in his vampiric days, Proinsias serves as Billy's sponsor as a recovering alcoholic. Introduced in "We Gotta Go Now" (reintroduced from Preacher), after "Billy" walks into his bar on St. Patrick's Day, Proinsias ejects the current company of Irish-American drunkards dressed as stereotypes from his bar, despite it otherwise being his most profitable day of the year, throwing an axe at the wall behind them to keep the customers back so that Billy can sit in peace. Entering into a quick and lively conversation with Butcher about their shared recovering alcoholic status, and reminiscing about times in the past when they would have acted like as "Stage Irishman" together, both Proinsias and Butcher toast their club sodas to the mantra of ["taking it"] "one day at a time". After hearing that Cassidy can write "fuck off" in the head of a pint of Guinness, an arriving Hughie – back from his undercover mission with the G-Men – orders such a drink before Butcher convinces him there is more to do. As the pair leave, Proinsias silently closes up the bar.

In AMC's unrelated adaptation of Preacher, Proinsias Cassidy is portrayed by Joe Gilgun, while Michael John Casey voices him in GraphicAudio's 2020 audio play series adaptation of The Boys.

Little Nina
Little Nina is a Russian mafia crime boss allied with Vought American to create more Supes. Nina is tasked with injecting 150 criminals with Compound V. She is short in height and has a penchant for vibrators. She plans to stage a coup against the Russian government, but is betrayed by Vought, and killed by Butcher after he replaces one of her vibrators with one set to explode.

In the live-action television series adaptation, "Little Nina" Namenko is portrayed by Katia Winter. This version is of normal height, is married to her primary enforcer Yevgenny, and is Frenchie's former employer and lover who is currently hunting for Cherie after she allegedly stole a drug shipment from her.

Mr. and Mrs. Campbell
Mr. and Mrs. Campbell are Wee Hughie's parents, who raised him in the semi-idyllic Scottish seaside town of Auchterladle. Introduced in Highland Laddie, Billy Butcher later secretly meets with and befriends them in order to acquire enough knowledge about them to trick Hughie into thinking he had murdered them, so that Hughie would then kill Butcher in an act of vengeance. By the time of epilogue series Dear Becky, set twelve years later, both of the Campbells have died, their gravestones revealing their names to have been "Daphne Margaret Campbell" (born 1943, died 2017) and "Alexander Fergus Campbell" (born 1937, died 2018).

In the first season of the live-action television series adaptation, Hugh Campbell, Sr. is portrayed by Simon Pegg, the original facial likeness reference for Wee Hughie. Mrs. Campbell, his wife and Hughie's mother, is mentioned as having abandoned the pair when Hughie was a child, with Hughie's love of Billy Joel stemming from his childhood memories of her.

Sam and Connie Butcher
Sam and Connie Butcher are Billy and Lenny’s parents. Sam was an alcoholic and was physically abusive towards Connie. Sam favored Billy, whom he also abused over Lenny because of how "similar" they are, which made Billy resent him more. After an incident that left Connie partially blind, Billy nearly kills his father, before eventually setting off to join the Royal Marines. Connie eventually leaves Sam and remarries, while Sam is left to die alone. Billy sets off to London after his father’s death and pisses on his corpse as a final goodbye.

In the live-action adaptation, Butcher's parents are portrayed by John Noble and Lesley Nicol respectively while Brendan Murray and Adrianna Prosser portray them in flashbacks. This version of the couple are still together during the events of the main series. After Sam is diagnosed with cancer, he and Connie fly to New York to tell Butcher, who attacks his father. She later meets with Butcher, telling him she sought to give him closure.

Lenny Butcher
Lenny Butcher is Billy's younger brother and the son of Sam and Connie Butcher. Lenny was one of the few people able to calm Billy when he went berserk, but was killed by a bus before the events of the comic series.

In the live-action TV series adaptation, Lenny Butcher is portrayed by Jack Fulton as a teenager and Bruno Rudolf as a child. This version bears a resemblance to Hughie, committed suicide years prior to the series due to constant abuse from his father, and appears in Billy's hallucinations.

Todd
Todd is an avid bespectacled fan of superheroes who idolizes Queen Maeve in particular, always referring to her as "my lady" and serving as a part of her harem of casual lovers at Vought Tower. When Homelander elects to execute Maeve ahead of enacting his coup, Todd obliviously offers to protect Maeve from the "gone bad" Homelander. She throws Todd directly at Homelander while throwing Starlight out of the building for her protection. Declaring himself a willing "human shield" in honor of Maeve, Todd is crushed after striking Homelander's chest at high speed.

In the live-action TV series adaptation, Todd is portrayed by Matthew Gorman. This version became Monique's boyfriend and Janine's step-father following the former's separation from Mother's Milk and idolizes Homelander following his birthday rant, to the point where Todd attends pro-Homelander rallies and believes everything Homelander says.

Janine
Janine Wallis is M.M. and Monique's young daughter. After being raised by M.M. alone due to her mother's drug addiction, Janine becomes rebellious and resentful of her father due to the Compound V passed genetically to her from him and her grandmother resulting in her prematurely aging (although she appears to be a 16–17-year-old teenager physically, she is actually 12-years-old chronologically), showing him great disrespect while regarding Butcher with affection, calling him "Uncle Billy." Sometime later, having been absent due to helping Butcher with the Boys, M.M. discovers that in an act of rebellion, his ex-wife had convinced the underage Janine to star in a pornographic movie together with her. Before he can leave the Boys to confront his ex-wife over Janine, M.M. then gets a call from his daughter, who tells him that she was not in her right mind, and has run away from her mother, and wants to be left alone until she is well enough to call him. However, he tracks her down easily, and she reveals that Butcher murdered the producers and cast of the adult film, including brutally murdering Janine's mother in front of her. His final words, meant both as a warning and as a threat, were for Janine to leave M.M. alone; Janine expresses surprise at M.M.'s ignorance of Butcher's actions, having assumed he had been acting on M.M's orders, and M.M. assures her he will talk to Butcher.

In the live-action TV series adaptation, Janine Milk is portrayed by Nalini Ingrita in the first two seasons and Liyou Abere in the third. She has a close relationship with her father, who quits the Boys to spend more time with her, only to rejoin them because of Soldier Boy.

Television-exclusive characters

Laser Baby
"Laser Baby" is a character exclusive to the live-action television adaptation episode "Good for the Soul" and the Diabolical animated series episode "Laser Baby's Day Out", with vocal effects provided by Jenny Yokobori in the latter. The live-action version makes a minor appearance while the animated version was trained by Vought International scientist Simon to control her powers in the hopes that she will be adopted. After learning that she is going to be euthanized by Superbrain for failing every test she was given, Simon escapes with her, intending to adopt her himself.

Donna January
Donna January is Starlight’s emotionally abusive mother, portrayed by Ann Cusack. She initially seems supportive of her daughter’s dreams of joining the Seven, but is only supportive for her own financial gain. Annie cuts her off when she finds out her mother purposefully had her injected with Compound V, which is the real reason why her father left. Donna tries to weasel her way back into her life and puts herself in danger by getting involved in Starlight’s business. She is based on Starlight’s unnamed mother from the comics.

Cherie
Cherie is Frenchie's former criminal partner and a weapons specialist, portrayed by Jordana Lajoie. She helps the Boys on occasion by providing them with information, weapons, or anything else they ask for. She also acts as Frenchie's confidant and occasional romantic partner before their relationship becomes strained after Cherie provides Kimiko with assassination jobs. In season three, Cherie is on the run from "Little Nina" after the former allegedly stole a drug shipment from her. Little Nina eventually finds her, kidnaps Kimiko, and forces Frenchie to choose who to spare. However, Cherie and Kimiko escape their bonds and fight Nina and her enforcers until Nina escapes.

Monique
Monique is MM's ex-wife and Janine's mother. In the comic series, Monique Wallis is a drug addict incapable of raising the prematurely-ageing Janine properly.

In the live-action TV series adaptation, Monique is portrayed by Alvina August in the first season and Frances Turner in the third. Monique disagrees with MM joining Butcher’s crusade because of the danger it puts on their lives, leading to the fallout of their reconciliation. In the third season, while maintaining a healthy co-parenting relationship with MM, Monique has moved on and has a new husband named Todd, an avid Homelander and Vought fan. She is based on MM's unnamed ex-wife from the comics, a drug addict incapable of raising the prematurely-ageing Janine properly who later manipulated her into acting in a pornographic film.

Nathan Franklin
Nathan Franklin is A-Train's older brother and coach, portrayed by Christian Keyes. He tries to push A-Train to be the fastest superhero in the world and is firmly against his brother's use of Compound V to make himself faster. In season three, Nathan is hospitalized and paralyzed amidst an attempt by A-Train and Ashley Barrett to make Blue Hawk issue a public apology to Trenton, New Jersey's African-American community. Upon learning A-Train killed Blue Hawk, Nathan's relationship with his brother becomes strained, as he only wanted justice.

Elena
Elena is Queen Maeve's ex-girlfriend whom she still has feelings for, portrayed by Nicola Correia-Damude. They dated prior to Maeve’s relationship with Homelander and reconcile during season 2. Maeve is then publicly outed by Homelander and their relationship is revealed to the world. Elena continues to date Maeve as Vought pushes her to become a public figure, but they eventually break up when Elena learns the truth about the airplane crash. By the end of season three, Elena reconciles with Maeve as they go into hiding.

Ryan Butcher
Ryan Butcher is the 8-year-old son of Homelander and Becca Butcher exclusive to the live-action television adaptation, portrayed by Parker Corno in the first season and Cameron Crovetti in the second and third seasons. He lives a sheltered life with his mother at the behest of Vought until Homelander learns of his existence and begins paying him visits. Ryan is initially reluctant to be with his father, who pushes him to use his powers, but warms up to him after learning the truth about his life. Ryan is taken by Homelander and Stormfront, but is rescued by the Boys. Ryan inadvertently kills Becca with his heat vision while trying to protect her from Stormfront and is then taken in by Mallory to be kept hidden away from Homelander. However, with help from Victoria Neuman, Homelander finds Ryan and successfully wins him back.

He is based on the unnamed infant son of Black Noir and Becky Saunders, who Butcher beat to death in the comic series.

Kenji Miyashiro
Kenji Miyashiro is Kimiko's younger brother and a Supe with telekinetic abilities, portrayed by Abraham Lim. He was kidnapped by the Shining Light Liberation Army and was successfully indoctrinated into joining them. He comes to America to commit acts of terror because of Vought’s meddling into other countries. He tries to convince Kimiko to join him and is chased down by the Boys and the Seven, before being killed by Stormfront.

Adam Bourke
Adam Bourke is a film director, portrayed by P.J. Byrne. In season two, he is hired by Vought to helm a film about the Seven called Dawn of the Seven. In season three, following a year of re-shoots carried out by Tony Gilroy due to Stormfront's Nazi past being leaked and her resulting expulsion from the Seven, the "Bourke Cut" of the film is released (a parody of Rogue One and Zack Snyder's Justice League).

Church of the Collective
The Church of the Collective is a religious organization exclusive to the live-action television adaptation who recruit people to help spread their message.

Alastair Adana
Alastair Adana is the chairman of the Church of the Collective, portrayed by Goran Višnjić. When Eagle the Archer brought the Deep into the Church, Alastair worked to repair the latter's image by persuading Vought to let him help hunt down a Supe terrorist before making him a spokesperson for the Church. He later recruited A-Train after he was put on medical leave from the Seven, promising him to help him rejoin them. He eventually helps A-Train, but not the Deep. Alastair is later killed by Congresswoman Victoria Neuman, with the Church covering up his death by stating that he is on sabbatical.

Carol Mannheim
Carol Mannheim is a member of the Church of the Collective, portrayed by Jessica Hecht. When Eagle the Archer brought the Deep to the Church, Carol became his therapist and has him undergo an arranged marriage.

Cassandra Schwartz
Cassandra Schwartz is an anthropology professor at Vassar University and member of the Church of the Collective, portrayed by Katy Breier. She was among several candidates for the Deep's arranged marriage before being chosen by Carol. The pair eventually escape from the Church, with Cassandra becoming the Deep's ruthless and manipulative agent following his return to the Seven before she leaves him for suggesting they have a threesome with an octopus. After leaving the Deep, Cassandra publicly disavows him, writes an exposé about her relationship with him, and receives a book and film deal based on it.

Judy Atkinson
Judy Atkinson is Billy Butcher’s aunt exclusive to the live-action TV adaptation, portrayed by Barbara Gordon. She has kept Terror at her house since Becca’s disappearance and Billy’s crusade against the Supes. Billy goes to visit Terror at her house after Becca initially rejects his offer of escaping. Hughie and M.M. also arrive at her house, alongside Black Noir, who has been tracking Butcher. The group hides from Black Noir in her “taffy room”, where she stores her drug supply to sell to other elderly people. Her house is destroyed but Billy manages to successfully blackmail Mr. Edgar into calling off Noir before he could kill any of the Boys.

Jay
Jay is Frenchie and Cherie's best friend and former partner in crime, portrayed by Michael Ayres. On the night that Lamplighter killed Mallory’s grandchildren, Jay overdoses causing Frenchie to come to his aid, leaving his post and providing an opening for Lamplighter to enact his revenge. Frenchie states that he survived said overdose, but passed away a couple months later from another overdose.

Cindy
Cindy is a telekinetic individual exclusive to the live-action TV adaptation, portrayed by Ess Hödlmoser. A violent parody of Eleven, Cindy first appears in the second season as a test subject at Sage Grove psychiatric hospital, where Vought has been working to stabilize Compound V in adults. After the Boys infiltrate the facility and fight Lamplighter, they inadvertently release Cindy, who in turn frees her fellow patients to go on a rampage. Despite being incapacitated by Stormfront, Cindy survives and successfully escapes the facility and steals a car.

In the web series Seven on 7, set between the second and third season, Cindy's escape is revealed to have been widely reported on, with Black Noir being dispatched by Vought to hunt her down.

Other characters
 Cameron Coleman: A television host for the Vought News Network and host of Seven on 7 and The Cameron Coleman Hour, portrayed by Matthew Edison. He first appears in the former before appear in the live-action TV series adaptation's third season premiere.
 Zoe Neuman: The daughter of Victoria Neuman and adopted granddaughter of Stan Edgar who appears exclusively in the live-action TV adaption, portrayed by Olivia Morandin. After receiving Compound V from Homelander, Victoria injects Zoe with it.
 Lamar Bishop: A politician who appears exclusively in the live-action TV adaption, portrayed by Graham Gauthier. He was meant to be the Vice-Presidential pick for Robert Singer during his presidential campaign. However, Bishop was killed by the Deep on Homelander's orders. In light of Bishop's death, Victoria Neuman became the new Vice-Presidential pick.
 Yevgenny: Little Nina's husband and primary enforcer who appears exclusively in the live-action TV adaption, portrayed by Tyler Williams. He kidnaps Kimiko and Frenchie on Nina's orders, but is killed by a powerless Kimiko.
 Buster Beaver: The mascot of "Buster Beaver's Pizza Restaurant" who appears exclusively in the live-action TV adaption, voiced by Eric Bauza. Beaver, alongside his fellow animal mascots, have appeared as imaginary friends to Black Noir through the latter's life to help him come to terms with his traumatic memories.
 Simon is a former Vought International scientist who appears exclusively in The Boys Presents: Diabolical animated series episode "Laser Baby's Day Out", voiced by Ben Schwartz. He originally worked in Vought International's Vought-doption Center under Superbrain where he had to test each of the babies that were given Compound V. He did have trouble with one baby who shot lasers from her eyes. When Simon gets a glimpse that the laser baby was going to be euthanized with the other rejects, he works to save the laser baby while avoiding Vought's forces. With help from the laser baby, Simon overcame them and took the laser baby as his own child.
 Ghost: A translucent Supe who appears exclusively in The Boys Presents: Diabolical animated series episode "An Animated Short Where Pissed-Off Supes Kill Their Parents", voiced by Asjha Cooper. After being abandoned at the Red River orphanage by her parents and learning their powers are not natural, she joins forces with other Supe teens to take revenge on their parents. After killing her dad, Homelander kills her allies while Ghost is forced to retreat, vowing revenge on her mother.
 Mo-Slo: An athlete who became extremely slow and appears exclusively in The Boys Presents: Diabolical animated series episode "An Animated Short Where Pissed-Off Supes Kill Their Parents", voiced by Caleb McLaughlin.
 Boombox: A muscular man with a speaker for a head that can only play "Only Wanna Be with You" by Hootie & the Blowfish who appears exclusively in The Boys Presents: Diabolical animated series episode "An Animated Short Where Pissed-Off Supes Kill Their Parents".
 Fang: A teenage girl who grew sharp teeth that can almost bite through anything and appears exclusively in The Boys Presents: Diabolical animated series episode "An Animated Short Where Pissed-Off Supes Kill Their Parents", voiced by Grey Griffin.
 Kingdom: A teenage punk who can turn into every animal, but ends up with its mind as well, and appears exclusively in The Boys Presents: Diabolical animated series episode "An Animated Short Where Pissed-Off Supes Kill Their Parents", voiced by Parker Simmons.
 Aqua Agua: A boy who was turned into a sentient body of water colored like the Flag of Mexico and appears exclusively in The Boys Presents: Diabolical animated series episode "An Animated Short Where Pissed-Off Supes Kill Their Parents", voiced by Xolo Maridueña.
 Big: A deformed giant and friend of Human Tongue who appears exclusively in The Boys Presents: Diabolical animated series episode "An Animated Short Where Pissed-Off Supes Kill Their Parents", voiced by Parker Simmons.
 Human Tongue: A girl whose body was turned into a giant tongue and a friend of Big's who appears exclusively in The Boys Presents: Diabolical animated series episode "An Animated Short Where Pissed-Off Supes Kill Their Parents".
 Picante Balls: A teenage boy with testicles that can melt anything who appears exclusively in The Boys Presents: Diabolical animated series episode "An Animated Short Where Pissed-Off Supes Kill Their Parents".
 Ranch Dressing Cum Squirter: A boy who ejaculates ranch dressing instead of semen and appears exclusively in The Boys Presents: Diabolical animated series episode "An Animated Short Where Pissed-Off Supes Kill Their Parents".
 Boobie Face: A man born with female breasts on his face who appears exclusively in The Boys Presents: Diabolical animated series episode "An Animated Short Where Pissed-Off Supes Kill Their Parents", voiced by Kevin Smith.
 Flashback: A teenage boy who can foresee the past and appears exclusively in The Boys Presents: Diabolical animated series episode "An Animated Short Where Pissed-Off Supes Kill Their Parents".
 The Narrator: A metafictional, wheelchair-bound dwarf exclusive to the animated series episode "An Animated Short Where Pissed-Off Supes Kill Their Parents", voiced by Christian Slater. After narrating Ghost and various abandoned Supe teens' journey to kill their parents to the viewers, the Narrator proceeds to his father's house and narrates as he cuts off his face and wears it in retaliation for abandoning him while pretending that his father is proud of him.
 Papers: A teenage boy who can telekinetically control pieces of paper and appears exclusively in The Boys Presents: Diabolical animated series episode "An Animated Short Where Pissed-Off Supes Kill Their Parents", voiced by Justin Roiland.
 OD: A drug dealer who appears exclusively in The Boys Presents: Diabolical animated series episode "I'm Your Pusher", voiced by Kieran Culkin. Due to his working directly with Supes, Butcher blackmails him into spiking the Great Wide Wonder's heroin to make the latter kill himself.
 Boyd Doone: A Vought product tester who appears exclusively in The Boys Presents: Diabolical animated series episode "Boyd in 3D", voiced by Eliot Glazer. After using an experimental Vought transformation cream, he projects a reality where he successfully seduces his next-door-neighbor Cherry and they go on to have a relationship together. While his head in the original reality explodes from using too much cream, his fantasy continues on.
 Cherry Sinclair: A neighbor of Boyd's who appears exclusively in The Boys Presents: Diabolical animated series episode "Boyd in 3D", voiced by Nasim Pedrad. In Boyd's fantasy, he and Cherry begin a relationship and become famous influencers, during which she uses Vought's experimental transformation cream to give herself cat-like features.
 Sky: A teenager who appears exclusively in The Boys Presents: Diabolical animated series episode "BFFs", voiced by Awkwafina. After ingesting Compound V she had stolen from a local drug dealer, she awakes to find that her feces has attained sentience and named itself Areola before it is arrested by the Deep for Vought to study. Sky mounts a rescue attempt, during which she discovers she can manipulate excrement while fighting the Deep.
 Maya: The daughter of Nubian-themed superheroes Nubia and the Nubian Prince who appears exclusively in The Boys Presents: Diabolical animated series episode "Nubian vs Nubian", voiced by Somali Rose. As her parents prepare to file for divorce, Maya seeks to "parent trap" them back together by blackmailing their old Vought-sponsored nemesis, Groundhawk, into pretending to kidnap her. However, the plan fails and Maya signs her parents' divorce forms for them before blackmailing them into giving her a pony.
 John: An elderly Vought janitor who appears exclusively in The Boys Presents: Diabolical animated series episode "John and Sun-Hee", voiced by Randall Duk Kim. He steals a sample of Compound V is an effort to cure his wife's terminal pancreatic cancer.
 Sun-Hee: John's terminally ill, elderly wife who appears exclusively in The Boys Presents: Diabolical animated series episode "John and Sun-Hee", voiced by Youn Yuh-jung. John injects her with Compound V in an effort to cure her pancreatic cancer, only to unintentionally give her and her cancer superpowers, with the latter becoming a separate monstrous being. John attempts to run away with her, but she leaves to fight her superpowered cancer.

Notes

References

Lists of comics characters
Lists of action television characters
Lists of drama television characters
Lists of science fiction television characters
Characters created by Garth Ennis
WildStorm characters
Dynamite Entertainment characters